

297001–297100 

|-bgcolor=#fefefe
| 297001 ||  || — || October 18, 2001 || Kitt Peak || Spacewatch || FLO || align=right data-sort-value="0.75" | 750 m || 
|-id=002 bgcolor=#E9E9E9
| 297002 ||  || — || March 17, 2010 || Kitt Peak || Spacewatch || — || align=right | 3.0 km || 
|-id=003 bgcolor=#d6d6d6
| 297003 ||  || — || March 16, 2010 || Kitt Peak || Spacewatch || — || align=right | 3.4 km || 
|-id=004 bgcolor=#d6d6d6
| 297004 ||  || — || March 21, 2010 || Calvin-Rehoboth || Calvin–Rehoboth Obs. || — || align=right | 2.4 km || 
|-id=005 bgcolor=#fefefe
| 297005 Ellirichter ||  ||  || March 22, 2010 || ESA OGS || ESA OGS || — || align=right | 1.3 km || 
|-id=006 bgcolor=#d6d6d6
| 297006 ||  || — || March 21, 2010 || Kitt Peak || Spacewatch || KOR || align=right | 1.5 km || 
|-id=007 bgcolor=#fefefe
| 297007 ||  || — || March 20, 2010 || Kitt Peak || Spacewatch || NYS || align=right data-sort-value="0.69" | 690 m || 
|-id=008 bgcolor=#fefefe
| 297008 ||  || — || March 18, 2010 || Mount Lemmon || Mount Lemmon Survey || — || align=right data-sort-value="0.89" | 890 m || 
|-id=009 bgcolor=#d6d6d6
| 297009 ||  || — || March 25, 2010 || Kitt Peak || Spacewatch || 7:4 || align=right | 5.1 km || 
|-id=010 bgcolor=#E9E9E9
| 297010 ||  || — || March 18, 2010 || Mount Lemmon || Mount Lemmon Survey || — || align=right | 1.2 km || 
|-id=011 bgcolor=#E9E9E9
| 297011 ||  || — || March 19, 2010 || Kitt Peak || Spacewatch || — || align=right | 3.1 km || 
|-id=012 bgcolor=#fefefe
| 297012 ||  || — || March 25, 2010 || Kitt Peak || Spacewatch || V || align=right | 1.00 km || 
|-id=013 bgcolor=#E9E9E9
| 297013 ||  || — || March 20, 2010 || Kitt Peak || Spacewatch || — || align=right | 3.3 km || 
|-id=014 bgcolor=#E9E9E9
| 297014 ||  || — || March 21, 2010 || Mount Lemmon || Mount Lemmon Survey || — || align=right | 2.8 km || 
|-id=015 bgcolor=#d6d6d6
| 297015 ||  || — || March 25, 2010 || Mount Lemmon || Mount Lemmon Survey || — || align=right | 2.8 km || 
|-id=016 bgcolor=#E9E9E9
| 297016 ||  || — || March 17, 2010 || Catalina || CSS || — || align=right | 2.0 km || 
|-id=017 bgcolor=#fefefe
| 297017 ||  || — || December 1, 2005 || Kitt Peak || Spacewatch || V || align=right data-sort-value="0.79" | 790 m || 
|-id=018 bgcolor=#fefefe
| 297018 ||  || — || April 2, 2010 || WISE || WISE || — || align=right | 1.6 km || 
|-id=019 bgcolor=#C2FFFF
| 297019 ||  || — || April 1, 2010 || WISE || WISE || L5 || align=right | 14 km || 
|-id=020 bgcolor=#fefefe
| 297020 ||  || — || April 4, 2010 || Kitt Peak || Spacewatch || MAS || align=right data-sort-value="0.96" | 960 m || 
|-id=021 bgcolor=#E9E9E9
| 297021 ||  || — || April 8, 2010 || Mount Lemmon || Mount Lemmon Survey || — || align=right | 1.3 km || 
|-id=022 bgcolor=#E9E9E9
| 297022 ||  || — || January 26, 2001 || Kitt Peak || Spacewatch || — || align=right | 1.6 km || 
|-id=023 bgcolor=#fefefe
| 297023 ||  || — || April 6, 2010 || Kitt Peak || Spacewatch || — || align=right | 2.4 km || 
|-id=024 bgcolor=#E9E9E9
| 297024 ||  || — || April 6, 2010 || Catalina || CSS || PAE || align=right | 3.3 km || 
|-id=025 bgcolor=#d6d6d6
| 297025 ||  || — || April 7, 2010 || Hagen Obs. || M. Klein || ULA7:4 || align=right | 6.5 km || 
|-id=026 bgcolor=#fefefe
| 297026 Corton ||  ||  || April 7, 2010 || Sierra Stars || M. Ory || — || align=right data-sort-value="0.89" | 890 m || 
|-id=027 bgcolor=#E9E9E9
| 297027 ||  || — || April 7, 2010 || Kitt Peak || Spacewatch || — || align=right | 2.4 km || 
|-id=028 bgcolor=#d6d6d6
| 297028 ||  || — || April 7, 2010 || Mount Lemmon || Mount Lemmon Survey || TIR || align=right | 3.3 km || 
|-id=029 bgcolor=#E9E9E9
| 297029 ||  || — || April 15, 2010 || Kachina || J. Hobart || MAR || align=right | 1.1 km || 
|-id=030 bgcolor=#fefefe
| 297030 ||  || — || April 7, 2010 || Kitt Peak || Spacewatch || V || align=right data-sort-value="0.96" | 960 m || 
|-id=031 bgcolor=#E9E9E9
| 297031 ||  || — || April 7, 2010 || Kitt Peak || Spacewatch || PAD || align=right | 2.6 km || 
|-id=032 bgcolor=#fefefe
| 297032 ||  || — || April 7, 2010 || Mount Lemmon || Mount Lemmon Survey || — || align=right | 1.4 km || 
|-id=033 bgcolor=#d6d6d6
| 297033 ||  || — || April 8, 2010 || Mount Lemmon || Mount Lemmon Survey || EMA || align=right | 3.7 km || 
|-id=034 bgcolor=#fefefe
| 297034 ||  || — || April 10, 2010 || Kitt Peak || Spacewatch || NYS || align=right data-sort-value="0.75" | 750 m || 
|-id=035 bgcolor=#d6d6d6
| 297035 ||  || — || April 10, 2010 || Kitt Peak || Spacewatch || — || align=right | 2.7 km || 
|-id=036 bgcolor=#E9E9E9
| 297036 ||  || — || April 4, 2010 || Kitt Peak || Spacewatch || — || align=right | 1.0 km || 
|-id=037 bgcolor=#fefefe
| 297037 ||  || — || April 7, 2010 || Mount Lemmon || Mount Lemmon Survey || NYS || align=right data-sort-value="0.78" | 780 m || 
|-id=038 bgcolor=#E9E9E9
| 297038 ||  || — || April 10, 2010 || Mount Lemmon || Mount Lemmon Survey || — || align=right | 1.9 km || 
|-id=039 bgcolor=#d6d6d6
| 297039 ||  || — || April 8, 2010 || Catalina || CSS || — || align=right | 3.3 km || 
|-id=040 bgcolor=#E9E9E9
| 297040 ||  || — || April 14, 2010 || Mount Lemmon || Mount Lemmon Survey || — || align=right | 2.2 km || 
|-id=041 bgcolor=#fefefe
| 297041 ||  || — || April 10, 2010 || Kitt Peak || Spacewatch || NYS || align=right data-sort-value="0.85" | 850 m || 
|-id=042 bgcolor=#E9E9E9
| 297042 ||  || — || April 11, 2010 || Jarnac || Jarnac Obs. || — || align=right | 2.2 km || 
|-id=043 bgcolor=#d6d6d6
| 297043 ||  || — || April 11, 2010 || Mount Lemmon || Mount Lemmon Survey || MEL || align=right | 4.2 km || 
|-id=044 bgcolor=#fefefe
| 297044 ||  || — || April 18, 2010 || WISE || WISE || — || align=right | 1.4 km || 
|-id=045 bgcolor=#E9E9E9
| 297045 ||  || — || April 17, 2010 || Bergisch Gladbach || W. Bickel || — || align=right | 3.5 km || 
|-id=046 bgcolor=#d6d6d6
| 297046 ||  || — || April 20, 2010 || Mount Lemmon || Mount Lemmon Survey || — || align=right | 4.4 km || 
|-id=047 bgcolor=#C2FFFF
| 297047 ||  || — || April 15, 1996 || Kitt Peak || Spacewatch || L5 || align=right | 11 km || 
|-id=048 bgcolor=#C2FFFF
| 297048 ||  || — || October 21, 2001 || Kitt Peak || Spacewatch || L5 || align=right | 13 km || 
|-id=049 bgcolor=#C2FFFF
| 297049 ||  || — || April 24, 2010 || WISE || WISE || L5 || align=right | 13 km || 
|-id=050 bgcolor=#fefefe
| 297050 ||  || — || April 24, 2010 || WISE || WISE || FLO || align=right | 1.4 km || 
|-id=051 bgcolor=#fefefe
| 297051 ||  || — || April 24, 2010 || WISE || WISE || — || align=right | 2.6 km || 
|-id=052 bgcolor=#C2FFFF
| 297052 ||  || — || April 28, 2010 || WISE || WISE || L5 || align=right | 17 km || 
|-id=053 bgcolor=#d6d6d6
| 297053 ||  || — || April 30, 2010 || WISE || WISE || — || align=right | 2.5 km || 
|-id=054 bgcolor=#E9E9E9
| 297054 ||  || — || April 20, 2010 || Mount Lemmon || Mount Lemmon Survey || — || align=right | 3.5 km || 
|-id=055 bgcolor=#E9E9E9
| 297055 ||  || — || April 20, 2010 || Kitt Peak || Spacewatch || MIS || align=right | 1.7 km || 
|-id=056 bgcolor=#C2FFFF
| 297056 ||  || — || April 29, 2010 || WISE || WISE || L5 || align=right | 8.1 km || 
|-id=057 bgcolor=#C2FFFF
| 297057 ||  || — || December 18, 2004 || Mount Lemmon || Mount Lemmon Survey || L5 || align=right | 17 km || 
|-id=058 bgcolor=#d6d6d6
| 297058 || 2010 JO || — || May 4, 2010 || Catalina || CSS || — || align=right | 6.5 km || 
|-id=059 bgcolor=#C2FFFF
| 297059 || 2010 JV || — || May 1, 2010 || WISE || WISE || L5 || align=right | 17 km || 
|-id=060 bgcolor=#d6d6d6
| 297060 ||  || — || May 4, 2010 || Mayhill || iTelescope Obs. || — || align=right | 2.6 km || 
|-id=061 bgcolor=#d6d6d6
| 297061 ||  || — || May 3, 2010 || Kitt Peak || Spacewatch || — || align=right | 4.1 km || 
|-id=062 bgcolor=#d6d6d6
| 297062 ||  || — || May 2, 2010 || Kitt Peak || Spacewatch || — || align=right | 4.1 km || 
|-id=063 bgcolor=#E9E9E9
| 297063 ||  || — || August 6, 2002 || Palomar || NEAT || EUN || align=right | 1.5 km || 
|-id=064 bgcolor=#E9E9E9
| 297064 ||  || — || May 4, 2010 || Siding Spring || SSS || — || align=right | 1.7 km || 
|-id=065 bgcolor=#d6d6d6
| 297065 ||  || — || May 5, 2010 || Mount Lemmon || Mount Lemmon Survey || — || align=right | 3.8 km || 
|-id=066 bgcolor=#E9E9E9
| 297066 ||  || — || October 23, 2003 || Kitt Peak || Spacewatch || — || align=right | 1.5 km || 
|-id=067 bgcolor=#E9E9E9
| 297067 ||  || — || April 16, 2001 || Kitt Peak || Spacewatch || HEN || align=right | 1.0 km || 
|-id=068 bgcolor=#d6d6d6
| 297068 ||  || — || May 5, 2010 || Nogales || Tenagra II Obs. || — || align=right | 5.0 km || 
|-id=069 bgcolor=#fefefe
| 297069 ||  || — || May 5, 2010 || Mount Lemmon || Mount Lemmon Survey || — || align=right data-sort-value="0.90" | 900 m || 
|-id=070 bgcolor=#E9E9E9
| 297070 ||  || — || May 6, 2010 || Mount Lemmon || Mount Lemmon Survey || AGN || align=right | 1.6 km || 
|-id=071 bgcolor=#E9E9E9
| 297071 ||  || — || May 4, 2010 || Kitt Peak || Spacewatch || — || align=right | 1.3 km || 
|-id=072 bgcolor=#d6d6d6
| 297072 ||  || — || May 11, 2010 || WISE || WISE || — || align=right | 2.7 km || 
|-id=073 bgcolor=#d6d6d6
| 297073 ||  || — || May 11, 2010 || Mount Lemmon || Mount Lemmon Survey || — || align=right | 3.5 km || 
|-id=074 bgcolor=#d6d6d6
| 297074 ||  || — || May 13, 2010 || WISE || WISE || — || align=right | 5.1 km || 
|-id=075 bgcolor=#d6d6d6
| 297075 ||  || — || May 13, 2010 || Catalina || CSS || — || align=right | 5.3 km || 
|-id=076 bgcolor=#fefefe
| 297076 ||  || — || May 6, 2010 || Mount Lemmon || Mount Lemmon Survey || MAS || align=right data-sort-value="0.93" | 930 m || 
|-id=077 bgcolor=#d6d6d6
| 297077 ||  || — || May 8, 2010 || Mount Lemmon || Mount Lemmon Survey || THM || align=right | 2.8 km || 
|-id=078 bgcolor=#d6d6d6
| 297078 ||  || — || October 31, 2002 || Palomar || NEAT || 615 || align=right | 1.7 km || 
|-id=079 bgcolor=#d6d6d6
| 297079 ||  || — || May 4, 2010 || Catalina || CSS || — || align=right | 3.7 km || 
|-id=080 bgcolor=#E9E9E9
| 297080 ||  || — || May 16, 2010 || WISE || WISE || MIT || align=right | 2.7 km || 
|-id=081 bgcolor=#d6d6d6
| 297081 ||  || — || July 5, 2005 || Mount Lemmon || Mount Lemmon Survey || — || align=right | 4.5 km || 
|-id=082 bgcolor=#d6d6d6
| 297082 Bygott ||  ||  || May 17, 2010 || WISE || WISE || — || align=right | 3.1 km || 
|-id=083 bgcolor=#E9E9E9
| 297083 ||  || — || May 18, 2010 || WISE || WISE || — || align=right | 3.1 km || 
|-id=084 bgcolor=#E9E9E9
| 297084 ||  || — || May 18, 2010 || La Sagra || OAM Obs. || MIT || align=right | 3.5 km || 
|-id=085 bgcolor=#d6d6d6
| 297085 ||  || — || May 22, 2010 || WISE || WISE || — || align=right | 3.1 km || 
|-id=086 bgcolor=#d6d6d6
| 297086 ||  || — || May 23, 2010 || WISE || WISE || — || align=right | 3.6 km || 
|-id=087 bgcolor=#d6d6d6
| 297087 ||  || — || May 23, 2010 || WISE || WISE || MEL || align=right | 4.5 km || 
|-id=088 bgcolor=#d6d6d6
| 297088 ||  || — || May 24, 2010 || WISE || WISE || — || align=right | 3.3 km || 
|-id=089 bgcolor=#E9E9E9
| 297089 ||  || — || May 17, 2010 || La Sagra || OAM Obs. || — || align=right | 1.5 km || 
|-id=090 bgcolor=#fefefe
| 297090 ||  || — || May 31, 2010 || WISE || WISE || — || align=right | 1.1 km || 
|-id=091 bgcolor=#E9E9E9
| 297091 ||  || — || June 10, 2010 || Mount Lemmon || Mount Lemmon Survey || — || align=right | 3.1 km || 
|-id=092 bgcolor=#d6d6d6
| 297092 ||  || — || June 14, 2010 || WISE || WISE || — || align=right | 2.9 km || 
|-id=093 bgcolor=#E9E9E9
| 297093 || 2010 MD || — || June 16, 2010 || Sandlot || G. Hug || — || align=right | 2.0 km || 
|-id=094 bgcolor=#E9E9E9
| 297094 ||  || — || December 20, 2006 || Palomar || NEAT || — || align=right | 2.2 km || 
|-id=095 bgcolor=#d6d6d6
| 297095 ||  || — || August 30, 2005 || Kitt Peak || Spacewatch || — || align=right | 3.0 km || 
|-id=096 bgcolor=#fefefe
| 297096 ||  || — || November 13, 2007 || Kitt Peak || Spacewatch || — || align=right | 1.7 km || 
|-id=097 bgcolor=#E9E9E9
| 297097 ||  || — || June 22, 2010 || WISE || WISE || — || align=right | 2.4 km || 
|-id=098 bgcolor=#fefefe
| 297098 ||  || — || May 2, 2006 || Mount Lemmon || Mount Lemmon Survey || — || align=right | 1.2 km || 
|-id=099 bgcolor=#fefefe
| 297099 ||  || — || June 19, 2010 || Mount Lemmon || Mount Lemmon Survey || FLO || align=right data-sort-value="0.82" | 820 m || 
|-id=100 bgcolor=#fefefe
| 297100 ||  || — || July 4, 2010 || Kitt Peak || Spacewatch || NYS || align=right data-sort-value="0.87" | 870 m || 
|}

297101–297200 

|-bgcolor=#fefefe
| 297101 ||  || — || March 12, 2002 || Palomar || NEAT || NYS || align=right | 2.1 km || 
|-id=102 bgcolor=#E9E9E9
| 297102 ||  || — || September 12, 2001 || Socorro || LINEAR || — || align=right | 2.3 km || 
|-id=103 bgcolor=#E9E9E9
| 297103 ||  || — || April 18, 2009 || Kitt Peak || Spacewatch || — || align=right | 4.1 km || 
|-id=104 bgcolor=#d6d6d6
| 297104 ||  || — || July 23, 2010 || WISE || WISE || — || align=right | 3.4 km || 
|-id=105 bgcolor=#d6d6d6
| 297105 ||  || — || September 27, 2006 || Catalina || CSS || — || align=right | 3.8 km || 
|-id=106 bgcolor=#E9E9E9
| 297106 ||  || — || October 23, 2006 || Catalina || CSS || — || align=right | 1.7 km || 
|-id=107 bgcolor=#d6d6d6
| 297107 ||  || — || July 28, 2010 || WISE || WISE || — || align=right | 5.5 km || 
|-id=108 bgcolor=#d6d6d6
| 297108 ||  || — || September 6, 2004 || Siding Spring || SSS || MEL || align=right | 4.0 km || 
|-id=109 bgcolor=#d6d6d6
| 297109 ||  || — || October 12, 1999 || Kitt Peak || Spacewatch || HYG || align=right | 2.8 km || 
|-id=110 bgcolor=#d6d6d6
| 297110 ||  || — || December 2, 2005 || Kitt Peak || Spacewatch || — || align=right | 4.2 km || 
|-id=111 bgcolor=#C2FFFF
| 297111 ||  || — || June 19, 2007 || Kitt Peak || Spacewatch || L4 || align=right | 18 km || 
|-id=112 bgcolor=#fefefe
| 297112 ||  || — || August 11, 2010 || La Sagra || OAM Obs. || FLO || align=right data-sort-value="0.68" | 680 m || 
|-id=113 bgcolor=#fefefe
| 297113 ||  || — || August 10, 2010 || Kitt Peak || Spacewatch || — || align=right data-sort-value="0.96" | 960 m || 
|-id=114 bgcolor=#fefefe
| 297114 ||  || — || September 28, 2003 || Kitt Peak || Spacewatch || — || align=right data-sort-value="0.81" | 810 m || 
|-id=115 bgcolor=#d6d6d6
| 297115 ||  || — || August 31, 2000 || Kitt Peak || Spacewatch || KAR || align=right | 1.1 km || 
|-id=116 bgcolor=#fefefe
| 297116 ||  || — || September 9, 1977 || Palomar || PLS || NYS || align=right data-sort-value="0.70" | 700 m || 
|-id=117 bgcolor=#E9E9E9
| 297117 ||  || — || September 12, 2001 || Socorro || LINEAR || — || align=right | 1.9 km || 
|-id=118 bgcolor=#d6d6d6
| 297118 ||  || — || October 26, 2005 || Kitt Peak || Spacewatch || — || align=right | 2.9 km || 
|-id=119 bgcolor=#d6d6d6
| 297119 ||  || — || October 29, 2006 || Mount Lemmon || Mount Lemmon Survey || — || align=right | 3.3 km || 
|-id=120 bgcolor=#d6d6d6
| 297120 ||  || — || April 1, 2008 || Mount Lemmon || Mount Lemmon Survey || KOR || align=right | 1.7 km || 
|-id=121 bgcolor=#fefefe
| 297121 ||  || — || May 9, 2002 || Palomar || NEAT || V || align=right data-sort-value="0.82" | 820 m || 
|-id=122 bgcolor=#E9E9E9
| 297122 ||  || — || December 11, 2001 || Socorro || LINEAR || — || align=right | 2.5 km || 
|-id=123 bgcolor=#fefefe
| 297123 ||  || — || August 30, 2006 || Anderson Mesa || LONEOS || V || align=right | 1.0 km || 
|-id=124 bgcolor=#fefefe
| 297124 ||  || — || November 1, 2007 || Kitt Peak || Spacewatch || — || align=right data-sort-value="0.95" | 950 m || 
|-id=125 bgcolor=#FA8072
| 297125 ||  || — || December 20, 2004 || Mount Lemmon || Mount Lemmon Survey || — || align=right data-sort-value="0.82" | 820 m || 
|-id=126 bgcolor=#E9E9E9
| 297126 ||  || — || April 28, 2004 || Kitt Peak || Spacewatch || — || align=right | 2.7 km || 
|-id=127 bgcolor=#fefefe
| 297127 ||  || — || November 18, 1995 || Kitt Peak || Spacewatch || — || align=right data-sort-value="0.99" | 990 m || 
|-id=128 bgcolor=#d6d6d6
| 297128 ||  || — || September 27, 1994 || Kitt Peak || Spacewatch || — || align=right | 2.8 km || 
|-id=129 bgcolor=#fefefe
| 297129 ||  || — || October 1, 1999 || Kitt Peak || Spacewatch || V || align=right data-sort-value="0.75" | 750 m || 
|-id=130 bgcolor=#d6d6d6
| 297130 ||  || — || August 31, 2005 || Kitt Peak || Spacewatch || KAR || align=right | 1.5 km || 
|-id=131 bgcolor=#fefefe
| 297131 ||  || — || November 19, 2000 || Kitt Peak || Spacewatch || — || align=right data-sort-value="0.99" | 990 m || 
|-id=132 bgcolor=#fefefe
| 297132 ||  || — || September 24, 1960 || Palomar || PLS || — || align=right | 1.1 km || 
|-id=133 bgcolor=#E9E9E9
| 297133 ||  || — || June 4, 2005 || Kitt Peak || Spacewatch || — || align=right | 1.6 km || 
|-id=134 bgcolor=#fefefe
| 297134 ||  || — || September 19, 2003 || Kitt Peak || Spacewatch || FLO || align=right data-sort-value="0.64" | 640 m || 
|-id=135 bgcolor=#fefefe
| 297135 ||  || — || January 31, 2004 || Kitt Peak || Spacewatch || NYS || align=right data-sort-value="0.91" | 910 m || 
|-id=136 bgcolor=#E9E9E9
| 297136 ||  || — || November 13, 2006 || Catalina || CSS || EUN || align=right | 1.5 km || 
|-id=137 bgcolor=#fefefe
| 297137 ||  || — || January 19, 2004 || Kitt Peak || Spacewatch || MAS || align=right data-sort-value="0.86" | 860 m || 
|-id=138 bgcolor=#fefefe
| 297138 ||  || — || November 20, 2000 || Socorro || LINEAR || V || align=right data-sort-value="0.79" | 790 m || 
|-id=139 bgcolor=#fefefe
| 297139 ||  || — || September 30, 2006 || Mount Lemmon || Mount Lemmon Survey || MAS || align=right data-sort-value="0.74" | 740 m || 
|-id=140 bgcolor=#d6d6d6
| 297140 ||  || — || September 10, 2004 || Kitt Peak || Spacewatch || THM || align=right | 2.7 km || 
|-id=141 bgcolor=#E9E9E9
| 297141 ||  || — || September 25, 2001 || Socorro || LINEAR || — || align=right | 1.8 km || 
|-id=142 bgcolor=#fefefe
| 297142 ||  || — || December 14, 2003 || Kitt Peak || Spacewatch || V || align=right data-sort-value="0.78" | 780 m || 
|-id=143 bgcolor=#fefefe
| 297143 ||  || — || March 21, 1999 || Apache Point || SDSS || — || align=right data-sort-value="0.99" | 990 m || 
|-id=144 bgcolor=#C2FFFF
| 297144 ||  || — || October 12, 2010 || Mount Lemmon || Mount Lemmon Survey || L4 || align=right | 12 km || 
|-id=145 bgcolor=#fefefe
| 297145 ||  || — || September 12, 2006 || Catalina || CSS || MAS || align=right | 1.0 km || 
|-id=146 bgcolor=#fefefe
| 297146 ||  || — || February 3, 2009 || Siding Spring || SSS || H || align=right data-sort-value="0.96" | 960 m || 
|-id=147 bgcolor=#C2FFFF
| 297147 ||  || — || April 7, 2003 || Kitt Peak || Spacewatch || L4 || align=right | 11 km || 
|-id=148 bgcolor=#d6d6d6
| 297148 ||  || — || March 4, 1995 || Kitt Peak || Spacewatch || HYG || align=right | 5.1 km || 
|-id=149 bgcolor=#E9E9E9
| 297149 ||  || — || September 30, 2005 || Palomar || NEAT || WIT || align=right | 1.3 km || 
|-id=150 bgcolor=#E9E9E9
| 297150 ||  || — || January 28, 2003 || Kitt Peak || Spacewatch || — || align=right | 1.0 km || 
|-id=151 bgcolor=#E9E9E9
| 297151 ||  || — || August 10, 1997 || Kitt Peak || Spacewatch || — || align=right | 2.0 km || 
|-id=152 bgcolor=#d6d6d6
| 297152 ||  || — || February 14, 2002 || Cerro Tololo || DLS || — || align=right | 3.3 km || 
|-id=153 bgcolor=#E9E9E9
| 297153 ||  || — || December 17, 2001 || Socorro || LINEAR || WIT || align=right | 1.5 km || 
|-id=154 bgcolor=#E9E9E9
| 297154 ||  || — || February 28, 2008 || Kitt Peak || Spacewatch || — || align=right | 1.5 km || 
|-id=155 bgcolor=#C2FFFF
| 297155 ||  || — || December 20, 2009 || Kitt Peak || Mount Lemmon Survey || L4 || align=right | 12 km || 
|-id=156 bgcolor=#E9E9E9
| 297156 ||  || — || December 14, 2006 || Kitt Peak || Spacewatch || — || align=right | 1.7 km || 
|-id=157 bgcolor=#fefefe
| 297157 ||  || — || August 28, 2006 || Kitt Peak || Spacewatch || — || align=right data-sort-value="0.90" | 900 m || 
|-id=158 bgcolor=#C2FFFF
| 297158 ||  || — || September 30, 2009 || Mount Lemmon || Mount Lemmon Survey || L4 || align=right | 11 km || 
|-id=159 bgcolor=#fefefe
| 297159 ||  || — || November 11, 2007 || Mount Lemmon || Mount Lemmon Survey || — || align=right data-sort-value="0.95" | 950 m || 
|-id=160 bgcolor=#C2FFFF
| 297160 ||  || — || June 21, 2007 || Kitt Peak || Spacewatch || L4 || align=right | 8.3 km || 
|-id=161 bgcolor=#fefefe
| 297161 Subuchin ||  ||  || February 29, 2008 || XuYi || PMO NEO || V || align=right data-sort-value="0.83" | 830 m || 
|-id=162 bgcolor=#fefefe
| 297162 ||  || — || November 19, 2003 || Palomar || NEAT || FLO || align=right data-sort-value="0.87" | 870 m || 
|-id=163 bgcolor=#C2FFFF
| 297163 ||  || — || June 10, 2005 || Kitt Peak || Spacewatch || L4 || align=right | 13 km || 
|-id=164 bgcolor=#E9E9E9
| 297164 ||  || — || January 8, 2007 || Catalina || CSS || — || align=right | 2.3 km || 
|-id=165 bgcolor=#fefefe
| 297165 ||  || — || May 7, 2006 || Kitt Peak || Spacewatch || — || align=right data-sort-value="0.81" | 810 m || 
|-id=166 bgcolor=#fefefe
| 297166 ||  || — || October 15, 1995 || Kitt Peak || Spacewatch || NYS || align=right data-sort-value="0.62" | 620 m || 
|-id=167 bgcolor=#E9E9E9
| 297167 ||  || — || March 21, 2004 || Kitt Peak || Spacewatch || — || align=right | 1.2 km || 
|-id=168 bgcolor=#C2FFFF
| 297168 ||  || — || November 21, 2009 || Catalina || CSS || L4 || align=right | 12 km || 
|-id=169 bgcolor=#fefefe
| 297169 ||  || — || September 2, 2000 || Socorro || LINEAR || — || align=right data-sort-value="0.96" | 960 m || 
|-id=170 bgcolor=#d6d6d6
| 297170 ||  || — || April 1, 2008 || Kitt Peak || Spacewatch || — || align=right | 2.8 km || 
|-id=171 bgcolor=#d6d6d6
| 297171 ||  || — || July 18, 2004 || Campo Imperatore || CINEOS || — || align=right | 2.9 km || 
|-id=172 bgcolor=#fefefe
| 297172 ||  || — || December 5, 1996 || Kitt Peak || Spacewatch || V || align=right data-sort-value="0.55" | 550 m || 
|-id=173 bgcolor=#d6d6d6
| 297173 ||  || — || August 21, 2004 || Siding Spring || SSS || — || align=right | 3.2 km || 
|-id=174 bgcolor=#C2FFFF
| 297174 ||  || — || September 29, 2009 || Mount Lemmon || Mount Lemmon Survey || L4 || align=right | 12 km || 
|-id=175 bgcolor=#d6d6d6
| 297175 ||  || — || December 30, 2005 || Mount Lemmon || Mount Lemmon Survey || — || align=right | 4.0 km || 
|-id=176 bgcolor=#E9E9E9
| 297176 ||  || — || December 31, 2002 || Socorro || LINEAR || — || align=right | 1.4 km || 
|-id=177 bgcolor=#d6d6d6
| 297177 ||  || — || August 21, 2004 || Siding Spring || SSS || — || align=right | 3.5 km || 
|-id=178 bgcolor=#C2FFFF
| 297178 ||  || — || January 16, 2009 || Mount Lemmon || Mount Lemmon Survey || L4 || align=right | 12 km || 
|-id=179 bgcolor=#d6d6d6
| 297179 ||  || — || March 18, 2007 || Kitt Peak || Spacewatch || — || align=right | 3.3 km || 
|-id=180 bgcolor=#fefefe
| 297180 ||  || — || September 19, 2003 || Anderson Mesa || LONEOS || — || align=right data-sort-value="0.85" | 850 m || 
|-id=181 bgcolor=#E9E9E9
| 297181 ||  || — || October 1, 2005 || Kitt Peak || Spacewatch || HOF || align=right | 2.7 km || 
|-id=182 bgcolor=#C2FFFF
| 297182 ||  || — || December 17, 1998 || Kitt Peak || Spacewatch || L4 || align=right | 9.5 km || 
|-id=183 bgcolor=#fefefe
| 297183 ||  || — || September 8, 1999 || Socorro || LINEAR || ERI || align=right | 1.5 km || 
|-id=184 bgcolor=#d6d6d6
| 297184 ||  || — || January 26, 2006 || Catalina || CSS || EOS || align=right | 2.4 km || 
|-id=185 bgcolor=#d6d6d6
| 297185 ||  || — || December 2, 2005 || Kitt Peak || Spacewatch || — || align=right | 3.7 km || 
|-id=186 bgcolor=#fefefe
| 297186 ||  || — || December 19, 2003 || Socorro || LINEAR || — || align=right | 1.3 km || 
|-id=187 bgcolor=#fefefe
| 297187 ||  || — || January 31, 2004 || Kitt Peak || Spacewatch || — || align=right data-sort-value="0.98" | 980 m || 
|-id=188 bgcolor=#d6d6d6
| 297188 ||  || — || March 26, 2007 || Mount Lemmon || Mount Lemmon Survey || — || align=right | 2.7 km || 
|-id=189 bgcolor=#d6d6d6
| 297189 ||  || — || May 12, 2002 || Palomar || NEAT || — || align=right | 5.0 km || 
|-id=190 bgcolor=#d6d6d6
| 297190 ||  || — || February 22, 2006 || Catalina || CSS || — || align=right | 4.2 km || 
|-id=191 bgcolor=#fefefe
| 297191 ||  || — || March 17, 2004 || Kitt Peak || Spacewatch || — || align=right data-sort-value="0.96" | 960 m || 
|-id=192 bgcolor=#d6d6d6
| 297192 ||  || — || February 24, 2006 || Anderson Mesa || LONEOS || — || align=right | 4.8 km || 
|-id=193 bgcolor=#E9E9E9
| 297193 ||  || — || July 3, 2005 || Palomar || NEAT || — || align=right | 1.7 km || 
|-id=194 bgcolor=#C2FFFF
| 297194 ||  || — || July 26, 2006 || Siding Spring || SSS || L4 || align=right | 14 km || 
|-id=195 bgcolor=#C2FFFF
| 297195 ||  || — || July 18, 2007 || Mount Lemmon || Mount Lemmon Survey || L4 || align=right | 9.0 km || 
|-id=196 bgcolor=#C2FFFF
| 297196 ||  || — || October 27, 2009 || Mount Lemmon || Mount Lemmon Survey || L4 || align=right | 9.6 km || 
|-id=197 bgcolor=#E9E9E9
| 297197 ||  || — || September 26, 2005 || Kitt Peak || Spacewatch || — || align=right | 1.4 km || 
|-id=198 bgcolor=#d6d6d6
| 297198 ||  || — || February 7, 2000 || Kitt Peak || Spacewatch || — || align=right | 2.7 km || 
|-id=199 bgcolor=#E9E9E9
| 297199 ||  || — || January 13, 2002 || Socorro || LINEAR || — || align=right | 1.8 km || 
|-id=200 bgcolor=#d6d6d6
| 297200 ||  || — || May 14, 2001 || Kitt Peak || Spacewatch || EOS || align=right | 2.4 km || 
|}

297201–297300 

|-bgcolor=#E9E9E9
| 297201 ||  || — || April 19, 2007 || Mount Lemmon || Mount Lemmon Survey || DOR || align=right | 2.5 km || 
|-id=202 bgcolor=#E9E9E9
| 297202 ||  || — || March 24, 2003 || Kitt Peak || Spacewatch || — || align=right | 1.2 km || 
|-id=203 bgcolor=#d6d6d6
| 297203 ||  || — || September 7, 2008 || Mount Lemmon || Mount Lemmon Survey || — || align=right | 4.4 km || 
|-id=204 bgcolor=#d6d6d6
| 297204 ||  || — || October 30, 2009 || Mount Lemmon || Mount Lemmon Survey || — || align=right | 2.9 km || 
|-id=205 bgcolor=#d6d6d6
| 297205 ||  || — || October 10, 2002 || Apache Point || SDSS || — || align=right | 4.1 km || 
|-id=206 bgcolor=#fefefe
| 297206 ||  || — || September 29, 2005 || Kitt Peak || Spacewatch || — || align=right data-sort-value="0.77" | 770 m || 
|-id=207 bgcolor=#d6d6d6
| 297207 ||  || — || January 23, 2006 || Catalina || CSS || BRA || align=right | 1.9 km || 
|-id=208 bgcolor=#fefefe
| 297208 ||  || — || August 22, 2002 || Palomar || NEAT || V || align=right data-sort-value="0.93" | 930 m || 
|-id=209 bgcolor=#fefefe
| 297209 ||  || — || March 15, 2004 || Kitt Peak || Spacewatch || — || align=right | 1.3 km || 
|-id=210 bgcolor=#fefefe
| 297210 ||  || — || August 22, 1995 || Kitt Peak || Spacewatch || — || align=right data-sort-value="0.75" | 750 m || 
|-id=211 bgcolor=#d6d6d6
| 297211 ||  || — || September 19, 1998 || Apache Point || SDSS || BRA || align=right | 1.6 km || 
|-id=212 bgcolor=#E9E9E9
| 297212 ||  || — || January 23, 2006 || Kitt Peak || Spacewatch || — || align=right | 1.5 km || 
|-id=213 bgcolor=#E9E9E9
| 297213 ||  || — || October 19, 2003 || Apache Point || SDSS || — || align=right | 2.5 km || 
|-id=214 bgcolor=#fefefe
| 297214 ||  || — || February 17, 2007 || Kitt Peak || Spacewatch || V || align=right data-sort-value="0.75" | 750 m || 
|-id=215 bgcolor=#C2FFFF
| 297215 ||  || — || April 30, 2008 || Mount Lemmon || Mount Lemmon Survey || L5 || align=right | 12 km || 
|-id=216 bgcolor=#d6d6d6
| 297216 ||  || — || March 11, 2005 || Kitt Peak || Spacewatch || THM || align=right | 2.9 km || 
|-id=217 bgcolor=#E9E9E9
| 297217 ||  || — || January 30, 2006 || Kitt Peak || Spacewatch || — || align=right | 1.2 km || 
|-id=218 bgcolor=#C2FFFF
| 297218 ||  || — || June 14, 2010 || Mount Lemmon || Mount Lemmon Survey || L5 || align=right | 13 km || 
|-id=219 bgcolor=#d6d6d6
| 297219 ||  || — || March 3, 2005 || Catalina || CSS || — || align=right | 3.1 km || 
|-id=220 bgcolor=#E9E9E9
| 297220 ||  || — || October 18, 2003 || Socorro || LINEAR || JUN || align=right | 1.6 km || 
|-id=221 bgcolor=#C2FFFF
| 297221 ||  || — || November 20, 2001 || Kitt Peak || Spacewatch || L5 || align=right | 8.7 km || 
|-id=222 bgcolor=#E9E9E9
| 297222 ||  || — || March 9, 2005 || Kitt Peak || Spacewatch || — || align=right | 2.7 km || 
|-id=223 bgcolor=#E9E9E9
| 297223 ||  || — || November 8, 2008 || Kitt Peak || Spacewatch || — || align=right | 1.1 km || 
|-id=224 bgcolor=#fefefe
| 297224 ||  || — || October 6, 2004 || Kitt Peak || Spacewatch || NYS || align=right data-sort-value="0.92" | 920 m || 
|-id=225 bgcolor=#fefefe
| 297225 ||  || — || April 25, 2003 || Kitt Peak || Spacewatch || NYS || align=right data-sort-value="0.76" | 760 m || 
|-id=226 bgcolor=#E9E9E9
| 297226 ||  || — || September 24, 1960 || Palomar || PLS || — || align=right | 3.0 km || 
|-id=227 bgcolor=#E9E9E9
| 297227 ||  || — || September 25, 1973 || Palomar || PLS || — || align=right | 1.0 km || 
|-id=228 bgcolor=#d6d6d6
| 297228 ||  || — || October 17, 1977 || Palomar || PLS || THB || align=right | 4.5 km || 
|-id=229 bgcolor=#E9E9E9
| 297229 ||  || — || October 16, 1977 || Palomar || PLS || — || align=right | 2.0 km || 
|-id=230 bgcolor=#fefefe
| 297230 ||  || — || October 16, 1977 || Palomar || PLS || NYS || align=right data-sort-value="0.75" | 750 m || 
|-id=231 bgcolor=#E9E9E9
| 297231 ||  || — || October 16, 1977 || Palomar || PLS || — || align=right | 2.6 km || 
|-id=232 bgcolor=#fefefe
| 297232 ||  || — || October 16, 1977 || Palomar || PLS || — || align=right data-sort-value="0.94" | 940 m || 
|-id=233 bgcolor=#d6d6d6
| 297233 ||  || — || October 16, 1977 || Palomar || PLS || — || align=right | 3.1 km || 
|-id=234 bgcolor=#fefefe
| 297234 || 1960 SP || — || September 24, 1960 || Palomar || L. D. Schmadel, R. M. Stoss || NYS || align=right data-sort-value="0.57" | 570 m || 
|-id=235 bgcolor=#FA8072
| 297235 ||  || — || March 7, 1981 || Siding Spring || S. J. Bus || — || align=right | 1.1 km || 
|-id=236 bgcolor=#E9E9E9
| 297236 ||  || — || March 1, 1981 || Siding Spring || S. J. Bus || — || align=right | 1.9 km || 
|-id=237 bgcolor=#E9E9E9
| 297237 ||  || — || March 3, 1981 || Siding Spring || S. J. Bus || — || align=right | 2.7 km || 
|-id=238 bgcolor=#d6d6d6
| 297238 ||  || — || May 3, 1994 || Kitt Peak || Spacewatch || — || align=right | 3.0 km || 
|-id=239 bgcolor=#E9E9E9
| 297239 ||  || — || September 5, 1994 || La Silla || E. W. Elst || — || align=right | 2.2 km || 
|-id=240 bgcolor=#E9E9E9
| 297240 ||  || — || September 27, 1994 || Kitt Peak || Spacewatch || — || align=right | 1.7 km || 
|-id=241 bgcolor=#E9E9E9
| 297241 ||  || — || September 28, 1994 || Kitt Peak || Spacewatch || — || align=right | 2.2 km || 
|-id=242 bgcolor=#d6d6d6
| 297242 ||  || — || September 29, 1994 || Kitt Peak || Spacewatch || HYG || align=right | 3.0 km || 
|-id=243 bgcolor=#d6d6d6
| 297243 ||  || — || September 30, 1994 || Kitt Peak || Spacewatch || TIR || align=right | 3.5 km || 
|-id=244 bgcolor=#E9E9E9
| 297244 ||  || — || October 29, 1994 || Siding Spring || R. H. McNaught || BAR || align=right | 1.6 km || 
|-id=245 bgcolor=#fefefe
| 297245 ||  || — || October 28, 1994 || Kitt Peak || Spacewatch || — || align=right data-sort-value="0.88" | 880 m || 
|-id=246 bgcolor=#d6d6d6
| 297246 ||  || — || October 28, 1994 || Kitt Peak || Spacewatch || — || align=right | 4.2 km || 
|-id=247 bgcolor=#E9E9E9
| 297247 ||  || — || October 29, 1994 || Kitt Peak || Spacewatch || — || align=right | 1.7 km || 
|-id=248 bgcolor=#E9E9E9
| 297248 ||  || — || January 8, 1995 || Kitt Peak || Spacewatch || NEM || align=right | 2.1 km || 
|-id=249 bgcolor=#E9E9E9
| 297249 ||  || — || February 25, 1995 || Siding Spring || R. H. McNaught || PAL || align=right | 2.3 km || 
|-id=250 bgcolor=#fefefe
| 297250 ||  || — || March 2, 1995 || Kitt Peak || Spacewatch || — || align=right | 1.0 km || 
|-id=251 bgcolor=#fefefe
| 297251 ||  || — || March 26, 1995 || Kitt Peak || Spacewatch || NYS || align=right data-sort-value="0.86" | 860 m || 
|-id=252 bgcolor=#fefefe
| 297252 ||  || — || April 2, 1995 || Kitt Peak || Spacewatch || NYS || align=right data-sort-value="0.96" | 960 m || 
|-id=253 bgcolor=#d6d6d6
| 297253 ||  || — || August 27, 1995 || Kitt Peak || Spacewatch || EOS || align=right | 2.4 km || 
|-id=254 bgcolor=#d6d6d6
| 297254 ||  || — || September 17, 1995 || Kitt Peak || Spacewatch || — || align=right | 3.1 km || 
|-id=255 bgcolor=#d6d6d6
| 297255 ||  || — || September 26, 1995 || Kitt Peak || Spacewatch || EMA || align=right | 4.2 km || 
|-id=256 bgcolor=#d6d6d6
| 297256 ||  || — || September 26, 1995 || Kitt Peak || Spacewatch || — || align=right | 4.6 km || 
|-id=257 bgcolor=#d6d6d6
| 297257 ||  || — || September 24, 1995 || Kitt Peak || Spacewatch || THM || align=right | 2.3 km || 
|-id=258 bgcolor=#d6d6d6
| 297258 ||  || — || September 19, 1995 || Kitt Peak || Spacewatch || HYG || align=right | 3.0 km || 
|-id=259 bgcolor=#d6d6d6
| 297259 ||  || — || September 17, 1995 || Kitt Peak || Spacewatch || — || align=right | 3.5 km || 
|-id=260 bgcolor=#d6d6d6
| 297260 ||  || — || September 20, 1995 || Kitt Peak || Spacewatch || — || align=right | 2.3 km || 
|-id=261 bgcolor=#d6d6d6
| 297261 ||  || — || September 21, 1995 || Kitt Peak || Spacewatch || — || align=right | 2.7 km || 
|-id=262 bgcolor=#E9E9E9
| 297262 ||  || — || October 15, 1995 || Kitt Peak || Spacewatch || — || align=right data-sort-value="0.72" | 720 m || 
|-id=263 bgcolor=#fefefe
| 297263 ||  || — || October 15, 1995 || Kitt Peak || Spacewatch || — || align=right data-sort-value="0.80" | 800 m || 
|-id=264 bgcolor=#d6d6d6
| 297264 ||  || — || October 15, 1995 || Kitt Peak || Spacewatch || — || align=right | 4.6 km || 
|-id=265 bgcolor=#E9E9E9
| 297265 ||  || — || October 17, 1995 || Kitt Peak || Spacewatch || — || align=right data-sort-value="0.99" | 990 m || 
|-id=266 bgcolor=#d6d6d6
| 297266 ||  || — || October 17, 1995 || Kitt Peak || Spacewatch || — || align=right | 3.9 km || 
|-id=267 bgcolor=#fefefe
| 297267 ||  || — || October 19, 1995 || Kitt Peak || Spacewatch || — || align=right | 1.1 km || 
|-id=268 bgcolor=#d6d6d6
| 297268 ||  || — || November 15, 1995 || Kitt Peak || Spacewatch || — || align=right | 5.0 km || 
|-id=269 bgcolor=#fefefe
| 297269 ||  || — || November 15, 1995 || Kitt Peak || Spacewatch || — || align=right data-sort-value="0.91" | 910 m || 
|-id=270 bgcolor=#E9E9E9
| 297270 ||  || — || November 17, 1995 || Kitt Peak || Spacewatch || — || align=right data-sort-value="0.97" | 970 m || 
|-id=271 bgcolor=#d6d6d6
| 297271 ||  || — || November 17, 1995 || Kitt Peak || Spacewatch || — || align=right | 3.9 km || 
|-id=272 bgcolor=#E9E9E9
| 297272 ||  || — || January 21, 1996 || Kitt Peak || Spacewatch || — || align=right | 1.8 km || 
|-id=273 bgcolor=#E9E9E9
| 297273 ||  || — || March 17, 1996 || Kitt Peak || Spacewatch || — || align=right | 1.7 km || 
|-id=274 bgcolor=#FFC2E0
| 297274 || 1996 SK || — || September 17, 1996 || Haleakala || NEAT || APO +1kmPHA || align=right | 1.2 km || 
|-id=275 bgcolor=#fefefe
| 297275 ||  || — || October 7, 1996 || Kitt Peak || Spacewatch || — || align=right | 1.1 km || 
|-id=276 bgcolor=#d6d6d6
| 297276 ||  || — || November 4, 1996 || Kitt Peak || Spacewatch || — || align=right | 3.1 km || 
|-id=277 bgcolor=#d6d6d6
| 297277 ||  || — || November 5, 1996 || Kitt Peak || Spacewatch || — || align=right | 2.7 km || 
|-id=278 bgcolor=#fefefe
| 297278 ||  || — || December 4, 1996 || Kitt Peak || Spacewatch || — || align=right data-sort-value="0.71" | 710 m || 
|-id=279 bgcolor=#E9E9E9
| 297279 ||  || — || February 3, 1997 || Kitt Peak || Spacewatch || — || align=right | 1.1 km || 
|-id=280 bgcolor=#E9E9E9
| 297280 ||  || — || April 2, 1997 || Kitt Peak || Spacewatch || — || align=right | 2.2 km || 
|-id=281 bgcolor=#fefefe
| 297281 ||  || — || April 7, 1997 || Kitt Peak || Spacewatch || — || align=right data-sort-value="0.75" | 750 m || 
|-id=282 bgcolor=#E9E9E9
| 297282 ||  || — || April 28, 1997 || Kitt Peak || Spacewatch || MAR || align=right | 1.4 km || 
|-id=283 bgcolor=#E9E9E9
| 297283 ||  || — || July 1, 1997 || Kitt Peak || Spacewatch || — || align=right | 2.1 km || 
|-id=284 bgcolor=#fefefe
| 297284 ||  || — || July 7, 1997 || Kitt Peak || Spacewatch || — || align=right data-sort-value="0.79" | 790 m || 
|-id=285 bgcolor=#fefefe
| 297285 ||  || — || September 23, 1997 || Kitt Peak || Spacewatch || — || align=right data-sort-value="0.79" | 790 m || 
|-id=286 bgcolor=#fefefe
| 297286 ||  || — || September 27, 1997 || Kitt Peak || Spacewatch || FLO || align=right data-sort-value="0.95" | 950 m || 
|-id=287 bgcolor=#C2FFFF
| 297287 ||  || — || September 29, 1997 || Kitt Peak || Spacewatch || L4 || align=right | 8.6 km || 
|-id=288 bgcolor=#E9E9E9
| 297288 ||  || — || October 3, 1997 || Caussols || ODAS || PAD || align=right | 1.7 km || 
|-id=289 bgcolor=#FA8072
| 297289 || 1997 WF || — || November 18, 1997 || Oizumi || T. Kobayashi || — || align=right data-sort-value="0.84" | 840 m || 
|-id=290 bgcolor=#fefefe
| 297290 ||  || — || November 23, 1997 || Kitt Peak || Spacewatch || MAS || align=right data-sort-value="0.74" | 740 m || 
|-id=291 bgcolor=#fefefe
| 297291 ||  || — || December 3, 1997 || Chichibu || N. Satō || — || align=right | 1.1 km || 
|-id=292 bgcolor=#d6d6d6
| 297292 ||  || — || March 31, 1998 || Socorro || LINEAR || — || align=right | 4.7 km || 
|-id=293 bgcolor=#E9E9E9
| 297293 ||  || — || April 19, 1998 || Kitt Peak || Spacewatch || GER || align=right | 1.4 km || 
|-id=294 bgcolor=#E9E9E9
| 297294 ||  || — || June 21, 1998 || Kitt Peak || Spacewatch || — || align=right | 1.5 km || 
|-id=295 bgcolor=#E9E9E9
| 297295 ||  || — || August 17, 1998 || Socorro || LINEAR || — || align=right | 4.2 km || 
|-id=296 bgcolor=#E9E9E9
| 297296 ||  || — || August 24, 1998 || Socorro || LINEAR || JUN || align=right | 1.7 km || 
|-id=297 bgcolor=#E9E9E9
| 297297 ||  || — || September 13, 1998 || Kitt Peak || Spacewatch || — || align=right | 2.0 km || 
|-id=298 bgcolor=#E9E9E9
| 297298 ||  || — || September 14, 1998 || Socorro || LINEAR || — || align=right | 2.6 km || 
|-id=299 bgcolor=#fefefe
| 297299 ||  || — || September 14, 1998 || Socorro || LINEAR || — || align=right | 1.1 km || 
|-id=300 bgcolor=#FFC2E0
| 297300 ||  || — || September 23, 1998 || Socorro || LINEAR || APOPHA || align=right data-sort-value="0.32" | 320 m || 
|}

297301–297400 

|-bgcolor=#E9E9E9
| 297301 ||  || — || September 21, 1998 || Kitt Peak || Spacewatch || — || align=right | 1.7 km || 
|-id=302 bgcolor=#E9E9E9
| 297302 ||  || — || September 23, 1998 || Kitt Peak || Spacewatch || MIS || align=right | 2.7 km || 
|-id=303 bgcolor=#fefefe
| 297303 ||  || — || September 26, 1998 || Socorro || LINEAR || — || align=right data-sort-value="0.93" | 930 m || 
|-id=304 bgcolor=#E9E9E9
| 297304 ||  || — || September 26, 1998 || Socorro || LINEAR || — || align=right | 1.5 km || 
|-id=305 bgcolor=#E9E9E9
| 297305 ||  || — || October 12, 1998 || Kitt Peak || Spacewatch || — || align=right | 1.6 km || 
|-id=306 bgcolor=#E9E9E9
| 297306 ||  || — || October 12, 1998 || Kitt Peak || Spacewatch || — || align=right | 2.0 km || 
|-id=307 bgcolor=#E9E9E9
| 297307 ||  || — || October 13, 1998 || Kitt Peak || Spacewatch || — || align=right | 1.4 km || 
|-id=308 bgcolor=#E9E9E9
| 297308 ||  || — || October 13, 1998 || Kitt Peak || Spacewatch || — || align=right | 1.6 km || 
|-id=309 bgcolor=#fefefe
| 297309 ||  || — || October 20, 1998 || Xinglong || SCAP || FLO || align=right data-sort-value="0.88" | 880 m || 
|-id=310 bgcolor=#E9E9E9
| 297310 ||  || — || October 18, 1998 || La Silla || E. W. Elst || — || align=right | 2.1 km || 
|-id=311 bgcolor=#E9E9E9
| 297311 ||  || — || November 11, 1998 || Caussols || ODAS || — || align=right | 2.9 km || 
|-id=312 bgcolor=#E9E9E9
| 297312 ||  || — || November 18, 1998 || Socorro || LINEAR || JUN || align=right | 1.3 km || 
|-id=313 bgcolor=#fefefe
| 297313 ||  || — || November 19, 1998 || Caussols || ODAS || — || align=right data-sort-value="0.62" | 620 m || 
|-id=314 bgcolor=#fefefe
| 297314 ||  || — || December 7, 1998 || San Marcello || M. Tombelli, A. Boattini || — || align=right data-sort-value="0.69" | 690 m || 
|-id=315 bgcolor=#E9E9E9
| 297315 ||  || — || January 19, 1999 || Kitt Peak || Spacewatch || HEN || align=right | 1.6 km || 
|-id=316 bgcolor=#fefefe
| 297316 ||  || — || April 19, 1999 || Kitt Peak || Spacewatch || — || align=right data-sort-value="0.94" | 940 m || 
|-id=317 bgcolor=#fefefe
| 297317 ||  || — || April 17, 1999 || Socorro || LINEAR || — || align=right | 1.2 km || 
|-id=318 bgcolor=#E9E9E9
| 297318 ||  || — || October 4, 1999 || Socorro || LINEAR || — || align=right data-sort-value="0.88" | 880 m || 
|-id=319 bgcolor=#E9E9E9
| 297319 ||  || — || October 3, 1999 || Catalina || CSS || — || align=right | 1.6 km || 
|-id=320 bgcolor=#E9E9E9
| 297320 ||  || — || October 9, 1999 || Socorro || LINEAR || — || align=right | 1.6 km || 
|-id=321 bgcolor=#E9E9E9
| 297321 ||  || — || October 10, 1999 || Socorro || LINEAR || — || align=right | 1.1 km || 
|-id=322 bgcolor=#E9E9E9
| 297322 ||  || — || October 10, 1999 || Socorro || LINEAR || — || align=right | 1.1 km || 
|-id=323 bgcolor=#fefefe
| 297323 ||  || — || October 15, 1999 || Socorro || LINEAR || — || align=right | 1.1 km || 
|-id=324 bgcolor=#E9E9E9
| 297324 ||  || — || October 15, 1999 || Socorro || LINEAR || — || align=right data-sort-value="0.93" | 930 m || 
|-id=325 bgcolor=#E9E9E9
| 297325 ||  || — || October 15, 1999 || Socorro || LINEAR || — || align=right data-sort-value="0.92" | 920 m || 
|-id=326 bgcolor=#d6d6d6
| 297326 ||  || — || October 6, 1999 || Socorro || LINEAR || — || align=right | 4.3 km || 
|-id=327 bgcolor=#E9E9E9
| 297327 ||  || — || October 10, 1999 || Socorro || LINEAR || — || align=right | 1.3 km || 
|-id=328 bgcolor=#E9E9E9
| 297328 ||  || — || October 30, 1999 || Kitt Peak || Spacewatch || EUN || align=right | 1.4 km || 
|-id=329 bgcolor=#E9E9E9
| 297329 ||  || — || November 3, 1999 || Socorro || LINEAR || — || align=right | 1.1 km || 
|-id=330 bgcolor=#E9E9E9
| 297330 ||  || — || November 9, 1999 || Socorro || LINEAR || — || align=right | 1.5 km || 
|-id=331 bgcolor=#E9E9E9
| 297331 ||  || — || November 10, 1999 || Kitt Peak || Spacewatch || — || align=right | 1.5 km || 
|-id=332 bgcolor=#E9E9E9
| 297332 ||  || — || November 12, 1999 || Socorro || LINEAR || — || align=right | 2.2 km || 
|-id=333 bgcolor=#E9E9E9
| 297333 ||  || — || November 14, 1999 || Socorro || LINEAR || — || align=right | 1.2 km || 
|-id=334 bgcolor=#E9E9E9
| 297334 ||  || — || November 11, 1999 || Kitt Peak || Spacewatch || — || align=right | 1.0 km || 
|-id=335 bgcolor=#E9E9E9
| 297335 ||  || — || November 15, 1999 || Socorro || LINEAR || EUN || align=right | 1.8 km || 
|-id=336 bgcolor=#E9E9E9
| 297336 ||  || — || November 9, 1999 || Kitt Peak || Spacewatch || — || align=right data-sort-value="0.78" | 780 m || 
|-id=337 bgcolor=#E9E9E9
| 297337 ||  || — || November 30, 1999 || Kitt Peak || Spacewatch || — || align=right | 1.8 km || 
|-id=338 bgcolor=#E9E9E9
| 297338 ||  || — || November 29, 1999 || Kitt Peak || Spacewatch || — || align=right data-sort-value="0.77" | 770 m || 
|-id=339 bgcolor=#E9E9E9
| 297339 ||  || — || November 29, 1999 || Kitt Peak || Spacewatch || — || align=right data-sort-value="0.82" | 820 m || 
|-id=340 bgcolor=#E9E9E9
| 297340 ||  || — || December 6, 1999 || Socorro || LINEAR || — || align=right | 2.0 km || 
|-id=341 bgcolor=#E9E9E9
| 297341 ||  || — || December 7, 1999 || Socorro || LINEAR || — || align=right | 2.1 km || 
|-id=342 bgcolor=#FA8072
| 297342 ||  || — || December 7, 1999 || Socorro || LINEAR || — || align=right | 3.0 km || 
|-id=343 bgcolor=#E9E9E9
| 297343 ||  || — || December 2, 1999 || Kitt Peak || Spacewatch || — || align=right | 1.2 km || 
|-id=344 bgcolor=#E9E9E9
| 297344 ||  || — || December 7, 1999 || Kitt Peak || Spacewatch || — || align=right | 1.0 km || 
|-id=345 bgcolor=#E9E9E9
| 297345 ||  || — || December 7, 1999 || Kitt Peak || Spacewatch || — || align=right | 1.3 km || 
|-id=346 bgcolor=#E9E9E9
| 297346 ||  || — || December 10, 1999 || Socorro || LINEAR || — || align=right | 1.5 km || 
|-id=347 bgcolor=#E9E9E9
| 297347 ||  || — || December 12, 1999 || Socorro || LINEAR || — || align=right | 2.2 km || 
|-id=348 bgcolor=#E9E9E9
| 297348 ||  || — || December 4, 1999 || Kitt Peak || Spacewatch || — || align=right | 1.3 km || 
|-id=349 bgcolor=#E9E9E9
| 297349 ||  || — || December 5, 1999 || Socorro || LINEAR || — || align=right | 1.7 km || 
|-id=350 bgcolor=#E9E9E9
| 297350 ||  || — || December 31, 1999 || Kitt Peak || Spacewatch || JUN || align=right | 1.4 km || 
|-id=351 bgcolor=#E9E9E9
| 297351 ||  || — || December 31, 1999 || Kitt Peak || Spacewatch || — || align=right | 1.3 km || 
|-id=352 bgcolor=#E9E9E9
| 297352 ||  || — || January 3, 2000 || Socorro || LINEAR || — || align=right | 2.1 km || 
|-id=353 bgcolor=#E9E9E9
| 297353 ||  || — || January 3, 2000 || Socorro || LINEAR || EUN || align=right | 1.7 km || 
|-id=354 bgcolor=#E9E9E9
| 297354 ||  || — || January 7, 2000 || Eskridge || Farpoint Obs. || — || align=right | 1.4 km || 
|-id=355 bgcolor=#E9E9E9
| 297355 ||  || — || January 25, 2000 || Socorro || LINEAR || — || align=right | 2.4 km || 
|-id=356 bgcolor=#E9E9E9
| 297356 ||  || — || January 28, 2000 || Kitt Peak || Spacewatch || — || align=right | 2.8 km || 
|-id=357 bgcolor=#E9E9E9
| 297357 ||  || — || January 29, 2000 || Kitt Peak || Spacewatch || — || align=right | 2.4 km || 
|-id=358 bgcolor=#E9E9E9
| 297358 ||  || — || February 2, 2000 || Socorro || LINEAR || — || align=right | 1.4 km || 
|-id=359 bgcolor=#E9E9E9
| 297359 ||  || — || February 5, 2000 || Kitt Peak || M. W. Buie || — || align=right | 1.7 km || 
|-id=360 bgcolor=#E9E9E9
| 297360 ||  || — || February 6, 2000 || Kitt Peak || M. W. Buie || NEM || align=right | 2.2 km || 
|-id=361 bgcolor=#E9E9E9
| 297361 ||  || — || February 3, 2000 || Kitt Peak || Spacewatch || — || align=right | 1.5 km || 
|-id=362 bgcolor=#E9E9E9
| 297362 ||  || — || February 6, 2000 || Kitt Peak || Spacewatch || — || align=right | 1.8 km || 
|-id=363 bgcolor=#E9E9E9
| 297363 ||  || — || February 27, 2000 || Kitt Peak || Spacewatch || — || align=right | 2.1 km || 
|-id=364 bgcolor=#FA8072
| 297364 ||  || — || February 29, 2000 || Socorro || LINEAR || — || align=right | 1.6 km || 
|-id=365 bgcolor=#E9E9E9
| 297365 ||  || — || February 29, 2000 || Socorro || LINEAR || — || align=right | 3.1 km || 
|-id=366 bgcolor=#E9E9E9
| 297366 ||  || — || February 29, 2000 || Socorro || LINEAR || — || align=right | 1.9 km || 
|-id=367 bgcolor=#E9E9E9
| 297367 ||  || — || February 29, 2000 || Socorro || LINEAR || DOR || align=right | 3.6 km || 
|-id=368 bgcolor=#E9E9E9
| 297368 ||  || — || February 27, 2000 || Kitt Peak || Spacewatch || — || align=right | 1.5 km || 
|-id=369 bgcolor=#fefefe
| 297369 ||  || — || March 3, 2000 || Socorro || LINEAR || — || align=right data-sort-value="0.97" | 970 m || 
|-id=370 bgcolor=#E9E9E9
| 297370 ||  || — || March 3, 2000 || Socorro || LINEAR || BAR || align=right | 2.5 km || 
|-id=371 bgcolor=#E9E9E9
| 297371 ||  || — || March 29, 2000 || Kitt Peak || Spacewatch || — || align=right | 2.8 km || 
|-id=372 bgcolor=#E9E9E9
| 297372 ||  || — || April 4, 2000 || Socorro || LINEAR || — || align=right | 2.9 km || 
|-id=373 bgcolor=#E9E9E9
| 297373 ||  || — || April 5, 2000 || Anderson Mesa || LONEOS || DOR || align=right | 3.2 km || 
|-id=374 bgcolor=#fefefe
| 297374 ||  || — || April 29, 2000 || Anderson Mesa || LONEOS || H || align=right data-sort-value="0.67" | 670 m || 
|-id=375 bgcolor=#E9E9E9
| 297375 ||  || — || May 5, 2000 || Kitt Peak || Spacewatch || HOF || align=right | 3.0 km || 
|-id=376 bgcolor=#E9E9E9
| 297376 ||  || — || May 7, 2000 || Socorro || LINEAR || — || align=right | 3.1 km || 
|-id=377 bgcolor=#fefefe
| 297377 ||  || — || May 24, 2000 || Kitt Peak || Spacewatch || — || align=right | 1.4 km || 
|-id=378 bgcolor=#d6d6d6
| 297378 ||  || — || May 28, 2000 || Kitt Peak || Spacewatch || — || align=right | 2.6 km || 
|-id=379 bgcolor=#fefefe
| 297379 ||  || — || July 30, 2000 || Socorro || LINEAR || — || align=right | 1.6 km || 
|-id=380 bgcolor=#FA8072
| 297380 ||  || — || July 31, 2000 || Socorro || LINEAR || — || align=right | 1.0 km || 
|-id=381 bgcolor=#fefefe
| 297381 ||  || — || August 3, 2000 || Kitt Peak || Spacewatch || — || align=right data-sort-value="0.90" | 900 m || 
|-id=382 bgcolor=#d6d6d6
| 297382 || 2000 QC || — || August 21, 2000 || Emerald Lane || L. Ball || — || align=right | 4.1 km || 
|-id=383 bgcolor=#fefefe
| 297383 ||  || — || August 23, 2000 || Ondřejov || P. Kušnirák, P. Pravec || — || align=right | 1.2 km || 
|-id=384 bgcolor=#fefefe
| 297384 ||  || — || August 24, 2000 || Socorro || LINEAR || EUT || align=right data-sort-value="0.82" | 820 m || 
|-id=385 bgcolor=#fefefe
| 297385 ||  || — || August 24, 2000 || Socorro || LINEAR || NYS || align=right data-sort-value="0.86" | 860 m || 
|-id=386 bgcolor=#fefefe
| 297386 ||  || — || August 24, 2000 || Socorro || LINEAR || — || align=right | 1.2 km || 
|-id=387 bgcolor=#fefefe
| 297387 ||  || — || August 24, 2000 || Socorro || LINEAR || NYS || align=right data-sort-value="0.69" | 690 m || 
|-id=388 bgcolor=#d6d6d6
| 297388 ||  || — || August 28, 2000 || Socorro || LINEAR || — || align=right | 4.1 km || 
|-id=389 bgcolor=#d6d6d6
| 297389 ||  || — || August 24, 2000 || Socorro || LINEAR || — || align=right | 2.4 km || 
|-id=390 bgcolor=#fefefe
| 297390 ||  || — || August 25, 2000 || Socorro || LINEAR || ERI || align=right | 2.4 km || 
|-id=391 bgcolor=#fefefe
| 297391 ||  || — || August 25, 2000 || Socorro || LINEAR || — || align=right | 1.1 km || 
|-id=392 bgcolor=#d6d6d6
| 297392 ||  || — || August 29, 2000 || Socorro || LINEAR || — || align=right | 3.9 km || 
|-id=393 bgcolor=#d6d6d6
| 297393 ||  || — || August 31, 2000 || Kitt Peak || Spacewatch || — || align=right | 2.4 km || 
|-id=394 bgcolor=#fefefe
| 297394 ||  || — || August 26, 2000 || Socorro || LINEAR || NYS || align=right data-sort-value="0.82" | 820 m || 
|-id=395 bgcolor=#fefefe
| 297395 ||  || — || August 29, 2000 || Socorro || LINEAR || FLO || align=right data-sort-value="0.81" | 810 m || 
|-id=396 bgcolor=#fefefe
| 297396 ||  || — || August 31, 2000 || Socorro || LINEAR || — || align=right | 2.7 km || 
|-id=397 bgcolor=#fefefe
| 297397 ||  || — || August 31, 2000 || Socorro || LINEAR || — || align=right | 1.0 km || 
|-id=398 bgcolor=#fefefe
| 297398 ||  || — || August 31, 2000 || Socorro || LINEAR || — || align=right | 1.1 km || 
|-id=399 bgcolor=#d6d6d6
| 297399 ||  || — || August 26, 2000 || Socorro || LINEAR || — || align=right | 3.6 km || 
|-id=400 bgcolor=#d6d6d6
| 297400 ||  || — || August 29, 2000 || Socorro || LINEAR || — || align=right | 4.1 km || 
|}

297401–297500 

|-bgcolor=#d6d6d6
| 297401 ||  || — || August 29, 2000 || Socorro || LINEAR || — || align=right | 3.5 km || 
|-id=402 bgcolor=#fefefe
| 297402 ||  || — || August 29, 2000 || Socorro || LINEAR || NYS || align=right data-sort-value="0.79" | 790 m || 
|-id=403 bgcolor=#d6d6d6
| 297403 ||  || — || August 31, 2000 || Socorro || LINEAR || LIX || align=right | 5.9 km || 
|-id=404 bgcolor=#fefefe
| 297404 ||  || — || August 31, 2000 || Socorro || LINEAR || — || align=right data-sort-value="0.98" | 980 m || 
|-id=405 bgcolor=#fefefe
| 297405 ||  || — || August 21, 2000 || Anderson Mesa || LONEOS || V || align=right data-sort-value="0.93" | 930 m || 
|-id=406 bgcolor=#fefefe
| 297406 ||  || — || August 25, 2000 || Cerro Tololo || M. W. Buie || NYS || align=right data-sort-value="0.73" | 730 m || 
|-id=407 bgcolor=#d6d6d6
| 297407 ||  || — || September 1, 2000 || Socorro || LINEAR || — || align=right | 4.4 km || 
|-id=408 bgcolor=#fefefe
| 297408 ||  || — || September 2, 2000 || Socorro || LINEAR || — || align=right | 3.2 km || 
|-id=409 bgcolor=#fefefe
| 297409 Mållgan ||  ||  || September 1, 2000 || Saltsjöbaden || A. Brandeker || — || align=right data-sort-value="0.89" | 890 m || 
|-id=410 bgcolor=#d6d6d6
| 297410 ||  || — || September 1, 2000 || Socorro || LINEAR || — || align=right | 3.5 km || 
|-id=411 bgcolor=#fefefe
| 297411 ||  || — || September 3, 2000 || Apache Point || SDSS || NYS || align=right data-sort-value="0.86" | 860 m || 
|-id=412 bgcolor=#d6d6d6
| 297412 ||  || — || September 18, 2000 || Socorro || LINEAR || EUP || align=right | 4.6 km || 
|-id=413 bgcolor=#d6d6d6
| 297413 ||  || — || September 23, 2000 || Socorro || LINEAR || EOS || align=right | 2.8 km || 
|-id=414 bgcolor=#d6d6d6
| 297414 ||  || — || September 23, 2000 || Socorro || LINEAR || — || align=right | 4.2 km || 
|-id=415 bgcolor=#d6d6d6
| 297415 ||  || — || September 23, 2000 || Socorro || LINEAR || — || align=right | 4.4 km || 
|-id=416 bgcolor=#fefefe
| 297416 ||  || — || September 24, 2000 || Socorro || LINEAR || — || align=right | 1.00 km || 
|-id=417 bgcolor=#d6d6d6
| 297417 ||  || — || September 24, 2000 || Socorro || LINEAR || — || align=right | 3.9 km || 
|-id=418 bgcolor=#FFC2E0
| 297418 ||  || — || September 25, 2000 || Socorro || LINEAR || ATEPHA || align=right data-sort-value="0.41" | 410 m || 
|-id=419 bgcolor=#d6d6d6
| 297419 ||  || — || September 22, 2000 || Socorro || LINEAR || — || align=right | 3.0 km || 
|-id=420 bgcolor=#d6d6d6
| 297420 ||  || — || September 23, 2000 || Socorro || LINEAR || — || align=right | 4.6 km || 
|-id=421 bgcolor=#d6d6d6
| 297421 ||  || — || September 23, 2000 || Socorro || LINEAR || — || align=right | 3.3 km || 
|-id=422 bgcolor=#fefefe
| 297422 ||  || — || September 24, 2000 || Socorro || LINEAR || NYS || align=right data-sort-value="0.72" | 720 m || 
|-id=423 bgcolor=#d6d6d6
| 297423 ||  || — || September 24, 2000 || Socorro || LINEAR || — || align=right | 4.4 km || 
|-id=424 bgcolor=#fefefe
| 297424 ||  || — || September 24, 2000 || Socorro || LINEAR || NYS || align=right data-sort-value="0.81" | 810 m || 
|-id=425 bgcolor=#fefefe
| 297425 ||  || — || September 24, 2000 || Socorro || LINEAR || NYS || align=right data-sort-value="0.84" | 840 m || 
|-id=426 bgcolor=#d6d6d6
| 297426 ||  || — || September 24, 2000 || Socorro || LINEAR || — || align=right | 3.8 km || 
|-id=427 bgcolor=#d6d6d6
| 297427 ||  || — || September 22, 2000 || Socorro || LINEAR || — || align=right | 4.4 km || 
|-id=428 bgcolor=#d6d6d6
| 297428 ||  || — || September 23, 2000 || Socorro || LINEAR || — || align=right | 5.0 km || 
|-id=429 bgcolor=#fefefe
| 297429 ||  || — || September 23, 2000 || Socorro || LINEAR || — || align=right data-sort-value="0.98" | 980 m || 
|-id=430 bgcolor=#fefefe
| 297430 ||  || — || September 23, 2000 || Socorro || LINEAR || — || align=right | 1.2 km || 
|-id=431 bgcolor=#d6d6d6
| 297431 ||  || — || September 23, 2000 || Socorro || LINEAR || EOS || align=right | 2.9 km || 
|-id=432 bgcolor=#fefefe
| 297432 ||  || — || September 23, 2000 || Socorro || LINEAR || V || align=right | 1.0 km || 
|-id=433 bgcolor=#fefefe
| 297433 ||  || — || September 24, 2000 || Socorro || LINEAR || ERI || align=right | 2.2 km || 
|-id=434 bgcolor=#d6d6d6
| 297434 ||  || — || September 27, 2000 || Socorro || LINEAR || — || align=right | 5.0 km || 
|-id=435 bgcolor=#fefefe
| 297435 ||  || — || September 24, 2000 || Socorro || LINEAR || H || align=right data-sort-value="0.99" | 990 m || 
|-id=436 bgcolor=#d6d6d6
| 297436 ||  || — || September 26, 2000 || Socorro || LINEAR || EUP || align=right | 4.8 km || 
|-id=437 bgcolor=#d6d6d6
| 297437 ||  || — || September 28, 2000 || Socorro || LINEAR || — || align=right | 4.5 km || 
|-id=438 bgcolor=#fefefe
| 297438 ||  || — || September 28, 2000 || Socorro || LINEAR || — || align=right | 1.6 km || 
|-id=439 bgcolor=#d6d6d6
| 297439 ||  || — || September 28, 2000 || Socorro || LINEAR || — || align=right | 4.3 km || 
|-id=440 bgcolor=#fefefe
| 297440 ||  || — || September 28, 2000 || Socorro || LINEAR || — || align=right | 1.4 km || 
|-id=441 bgcolor=#fefefe
| 297441 ||  || — || September 21, 2000 || Haleakala || NEAT || MAS || align=right data-sort-value="0.94" | 940 m || 
|-id=442 bgcolor=#C2FFFF
| 297442 ||  || — || September 24, 2000 || Socorro || LINEAR || L5 || align=right | 14 km || 
|-id=443 bgcolor=#fefefe
| 297443 ||  || — || September 24, 2000 || Socorro || LINEAR || V || align=right | 1.1 km || 
|-id=444 bgcolor=#d6d6d6
| 297444 ||  || — || September 24, 2000 || Socorro || LINEAR || — || align=right | 4.2 km || 
|-id=445 bgcolor=#fefefe
| 297445 ||  || — || September 26, 2000 || Socorro || LINEAR || NYS || align=right data-sort-value="0.76" | 760 m || 
|-id=446 bgcolor=#fefefe
| 297446 ||  || — || September 26, 2000 || Socorro || LINEAR || — || align=right | 1.5 km || 
|-id=447 bgcolor=#fefefe
| 297447 ||  || — || September 27, 2000 || Socorro || LINEAR || MAS || align=right data-sort-value="0.78" | 780 m || 
|-id=448 bgcolor=#fefefe
| 297448 ||  || — || September 27, 2000 || Socorro || LINEAR || H || align=right data-sort-value="0.80" | 800 m || 
|-id=449 bgcolor=#fefefe
| 297449 ||  || — || September 24, 2000 || Socorro || LINEAR || NYS || align=right data-sort-value="0.72" | 720 m || 
|-id=450 bgcolor=#d6d6d6
| 297450 ||  || — || September 24, 2000 || Socorro || LINEAR || — || align=right | 4.1 km || 
|-id=451 bgcolor=#fefefe
| 297451 ||  || — || September 24, 2000 || Socorro || LINEAR || — || align=right | 1.1 km || 
|-id=452 bgcolor=#d6d6d6
| 297452 ||  || — || September 24, 2000 || Socorro || LINEAR || — || align=right | 3.1 km || 
|-id=453 bgcolor=#fefefe
| 297453 ||  || — || September 24, 2000 || Socorro || LINEAR || NYS || align=right data-sort-value="0.90" | 900 m || 
|-id=454 bgcolor=#fefefe
| 297454 ||  || — || September 25, 2000 || Socorro || LINEAR || V || align=right data-sort-value="0.97" | 970 m || 
|-id=455 bgcolor=#d6d6d6
| 297455 ||  || — || September 27, 2000 || Socorro || LINEAR || — || align=right | 3.7 km || 
|-id=456 bgcolor=#d6d6d6
| 297456 ||  || — || September 28, 2000 || Socorro || LINEAR || Tj (2.97) || align=right | 4.4 km || 
|-id=457 bgcolor=#fefefe
| 297457 ||  || — || September 30, 2000 || Socorro || LINEAR || — || align=right | 1.2 km || 
|-id=458 bgcolor=#d6d6d6
| 297458 ||  || — || September 27, 2000 || Socorro || LINEAR || TIR || align=right | 3.5 km || 
|-id=459 bgcolor=#d6d6d6
| 297459 ||  || — || September 27, 2000 || Socorro || LINEAR || — || align=right | 4.5 km || 
|-id=460 bgcolor=#fefefe
| 297460 ||  || — || September 28, 2000 || Socorro || LINEAR || V || align=right data-sort-value="0.89" | 890 m || 
|-id=461 bgcolor=#d6d6d6
| 297461 ||  || — || September 30, 2000 || Socorro || LINEAR || — || align=right | 3.4 km || 
|-id=462 bgcolor=#d6d6d6
| 297462 ||  || — || September 26, 2000 || Socorro || LINEAR || TIR || align=right | 4.6 km || 
|-id=463 bgcolor=#d6d6d6
| 297463 ||  || — || September 30, 2000 || Socorro || LINEAR || — || align=right | 5.7 km || 
|-id=464 bgcolor=#d6d6d6
| 297464 ||  || — || September 28, 2000 || Kitt Peak || Spacewatch || URS || align=right | 3.1 km || 
|-id=465 bgcolor=#d6d6d6
| 297465 ||  || — || September 30, 2000 || Socorro || LINEAR || — || align=right | 4.7 km || 
|-id=466 bgcolor=#d6d6d6
| 297466 ||  || — || September 27, 2000 || Socorro || LINEAR || URS || align=right | 4.7 km || 
|-id=467 bgcolor=#d6d6d6
| 297467 ||  || — || September 27, 2000 || Kitt Peak || Spacewatch || — || align=right | 3.3 km || 
|-id=468 bgcolor=#fefefe
| 297468 ||  || — || September 23, 2000 || Socorro || LINEAR || — || align=right | 1.3 km || 
|-id=469 bgcolor=#d6d6d6
| 297469 ||  || — || September 22, 2000 || Socorro || LINEAR || — || align=right | 3.2 km || 
|-id=470 bgcolor=#d6d6d6
| 297470 ||  || — || September 30, 2000 || Anderson Mesa || LONEOS || — || align=right | 3.3 km || 
|-id=471 bgcolor=#d6d6d6
| 297471 ||  || — || October 1, 2000 || Socorro || LINEAR || — || align=right | 4.0 km || 
|-id=472 bgcolor=#d6d6d6
| 297472 ||  || — || October 1, 2000 || Socorro || LINEAR || — || align=right | 4.8 km || 
|-id=473 bgcolor=#fefefe
| 297473 ||  || — || October 2, 2000 || Socorro || LINEAR || — || align=right | 1.2 km || 
|-id=474 bgcolor=#d6d6d6
| 297474 ||  || — || October 3, 2000 || Socorro || LINEAR || TIR || align=right | 4.4 km || 
|-id=475 bgcolor=#d6d6d6
| 297475 ||  || — || October 2, 2000 || Kitt Peak || Spacewatch || — || align=right | 4.1 km || 
|-id=476 bgcolor=#d6d6d6
| 297476 ||  || — || October 4, 2000 || Kitt Peak || Spacewatch || URS || align=right | 4.1 km || 
|-id=477 bgcolor=#fefefe
| 297477 ||  || — || October 1, 2000 || Socorro || LINEAR || — || align=right | 1.5 km || 
|-id=478 bgcolor=#d6d6d6
| 297478 ||  || — || October 2, 2000 || Anderson Mesa || LONEOS || TIR || align=right | 3.6 km || 
|-id=479 bgcolor=#d6d6d6
| 297479 ||  || — || October 2, 2000 || Anderson Mesa || LONEOS || — || align=right | 4.5 km || 
|-id=480 bgcolor=#d6d6d6
| 297480 ||  || — || October 2, 2000 || Anderson Mesa || LONEOS || — || align=right | 4.7 km || 
|-id=481 bgcolor=#fefefe
| 297481 ||  || — || October 1, 2000 || Socorro || LINEAR || — || align=right data-sort-value="0.81" | 810 m || 
|-id=482 bgcolor=#FA8072
| 297482 ||  || — || October 24, 2000 || Socorro || LINEAR || H || align=right data-sort-value="0.98" | 980 m || 
|-id=483 bgcolor=#fefefe
| 297483 ||  || — || October 27, 2000 || Kitt Peak || Spacewatch || V || align=right data-sort-value="0.89" | 890 m || 
|-id=484 bgcolor=#fefefe
| 297484 ||  || — || October 29, 2000 || Oaxaca || J. M. Roe || NYS || align=right data-sort-value="0.97" | 970 m || 
|-id=485 bgcolor=#fefefe
| 297485 ||  || — || October 24, 2000 || Socorro || LINEAR || — || align=right data-sort-value="0.87" | 870 m || 
|-id=486 bgcolor=#fefefe
| 297486 ||  || — || October 25, 2000 || Socorro || LINEAR || — || align=right | 1.5 km || 
|-id=487 bgcolor=#fefefe
| 297487 ||  || — || October 29, 2000 || Kitt Peak || Spacewatch || V || align=right data-sort-value="0.92" | 920 m || 
|-id=488 bgcolor=#d6d6d6
| 297488 ||  || — || October 30, 2000 || Kitt Peak || Spacewatch || — || align=right | 3.8 km || 
|-id=489 bgcolor=#fefefe
| 297489 ||  || — || October 25, 2000 || Socorro || LINEAR || V || align=right data-sort-value="0.96" | 960 m || 
|-id=490 bgcolor=#d6d6d6
| 297490 ||  || — || October 25, 2000 || Socorro || LINEAR || LIX || align=right | 5.3 km || 
|-id=491 bgcolor=#d6d6d6
| 297491 ||  || — || October 25, 2000 || Socorro || LINEAR || — || align=right | 4.9 km || 
|-id=492 bgcolor=#d6d6d6
| 297492 ||  || — || November 1, 2000 || Socorro || LINEAR || — || align=right | 4.2 km || 
|-id=493 bgcolor=#d6d6d6
| 297493 ||  || — || November 1, 2000 || Socorro || LINEAR || — || align=right | 3.1 km || 
|-id=494 bgcolor=#fefefe
| 297494 ||  || — || November 1, 2000 || Socorro || LINEAR || — || align=right | 1.1 km || 
|-id=495 bgcolor=#d6d6d6
| 297495 ||  || — || November 1, 2000 || Socorro || LINEAR || LIX || align=right | 5.8 km || 
|-id=496 bgcolor=#fefefe
| 297496 ||  || — || November 19, 2000 || Socorro || LINEAR || — || align=right | 1.7 km || 
|-id=497 bgcolor=#fefefe
| 297497 ||  || — || November 19, 2000 || Socorro || LINEAR || — || align=right | 1.6 km || 
|-id=498 bgcolor=#fefefe
| 297498 ||  || — || November 21, 2000 || Socorro || LINEAR || — || align=right data-sort-value="0.82" | 820 m || 
|-id=499 bgcolor=#fefefe
| 297499 ||  || — || November 21, 2000 || Socorro || LINEAR || NYS || align=right data-sort-value="0.92" | 920 m || 
|-id=500 bgcolor=#d6d6d6
| 297500 ||  || — || November 26, 2000 || Kitt Peak || Spacewatch || URS || align=right | 4.7 km || 
|}

297501–297600 

|-bgcolor=#fefefe
| 297501 ||  || — || November 27, 2000 || Kitt Peak || Spacewatch || — || align=right | 1.2 km || 
|-id=502 bgcolor=#d6d6d6
| 297502 ||  || — || November 26, 2000 || Socorro || LINEAR || EUP || align=right | 5.9 km || 
|-id=503 bgcolor=#fefefe
| 297503 ||  || — || November 19, 2000 || Kitt Peak || Spacewatch || V || align=right | 1.2 km || 
|-id=504 bgcolor=#fefefe
| 297504 ||  || — || November 20, 2000 || Anderson Mesa || LONEOS || — || align=right data-sort-value="0.81" | 810 m || 
|-id=505 bgcolor=#d6d6d6
| 297505 ||  || — || November 19, 2000 || Socorro || LINEAR || — || align=right | 4.2 km || 
|-id=506 bgcolor=#d6d6d6
| 297506 ||  || — || November 16, 2000 || Kitt Peak || Spacewatch || HYG || align=right | 3.7 km || 
|-id=507 bgcolor=#fefefe
| 297507 ||  || — || November 18, 2000 || Anderson Mesa || LONEOS || NYS || align=right data-sort-value="0.79" | 790 m || 
|-id=508 bgcolor=#fefefe
| 297508 ||  || — || November 30, 2000 || Socorro || LINEAR || — || align=right | 1.3 km || 
|-id=509 bgcolor=#d6d6d6
| 297509 ||  || — || December 1, 2000 || Socorro || LINEAR || — || align=right | 4.6 km || 
|-id=510 bgcolor=#d6d6d6
| 297510 ||  || — || December 1, 2000 || Socorro || LINEAR || — || align=right | 4.2 km || 
|-id=511 bgcolor=#d6d6d6
| 297511 ||  || — || December 4, 2000 || Socorro || LINEAR || THB || align=right | 5.2 km || 
|-id=512 bgcolor=#fefefe
| 297512 ||  || — || December 20, 2000 || Socorro || LINEAR || — || align=right | 1.3 km || 
|-id=513 bgcolor=#fefefe
| 297513 ||  || — || December 30, 2000 || Socorro || LINEAR || — || align=right | 1.1 km || 
|-id=514 bgcolor=#d6d6d6
| 297514 ||  || — || December 30, 2000 || Socorro || LINEAR || — || align=right | 3.6 km || 
|-id=515 bgcolor=#E9E9E9
| 297515 ||  || — || December 30, 2000 || Socorro || LINEAR || — || align=right | 2.0 km || 
|-id=516 bgcolor=#d6d6d6
| 297516 ||  || — || January 17, 2001 || Socorro || LINEAR || — || align=right | 2.4 km || 
|-id=517 bgcolor=#E9E9E9
| 297517 ||  || — || January 21, 2001 || Socorro || LINEAR || — || align=right | 1.2 km || 
|-id=518 bgcolor=#E9E9E9
| 297518 ||  || — || January 19, 2001 || Socorro || LINEAR || MIT || align=right | 2.8 km || 
|-id=519 bgcolor=#E9E9E9
| 297519 ||  || — || January 27, 2001 || Haleakala || NEAT || — || align=right | 1.3 km || 
|-id=520 bgcolor=#E9E9E9
| 297520 ||  || — || January 21, 2001 || Socorro || LINEAR || — || align=right | 1.5 km || 
|-id=521 bgcolor=#fefefe
| 297521 || 2001 CE || — || February 1, 2001 || Prescott || P. G. Comba || — || align=right data-sort-value="0.92" | 920 m || 
|-id=522 bgcolor=#E9E9E9
| 297522 ||  || — || February 1, 2001 || Socorro || LINEAR || — || align=right | 1.9 km || 
|-id=523 bgcolor=#E9E9E9
| 297523 ||  || — || February 13, 2001 || Socorro || LINEAR || — || align=right | 1.6 km || 
|-id=524 bgcolor=#E9E9E9
| 297524 ||  || — || February 19, 2001 || Socorro || LINEAR || — || align=right | 1.5 km || 
|-id=525 bgcolor=#E9E9E9
| 297525 ||  || — || February 19, 2001 || Socorro || LINEAR || MAR || align=right | 2.0 km || 
|-id=526 bgcolor=#E9E9E9
| 297526 ||  || — || February 19, 2001 || Socorro || LINEAR || JUN || align=right | 1.4 km || 
|-id=527 bgcolor=#E9E9E9
| 297527 ||  || — || March 19, 2001 || Kitt Peak || Spacewatch || MAR || align=right | 1.3 km || 
|-id=528 bgcolor=#E9E9E9
| 297528 ||  || — || March 19, 2001 || Anderson Mesa || LONEOS || JUN || align=right | 1.8 km || 
|-id=529 bgcolor=#E9E9E9
| 297529 ||  || — || March 21, 2001 || Anderson Mesa || LONEOS || — || align=right | 2.0 km || 
|-id=530 bgcolor=#FA8072
| 297530 ||  || — || March 21, 2001 || Haleakala || NEAT || — || align=right data-sort-value="0.76" | 760 m || 
|-id=531 bgcolor=#E9E9E9
| 297531 ||  || — || March 26, 2001 || Kitt Peak || Spacewatch || — || align=right | 1.3 km || 
|-id=532 bgcolor=#E9E9E9
| 297532 ||  || — || March 19, 2001 || Anderson Mesa || LONEOS || — || align=right | 1.1 km || 
|-id=533 bgcolor=#E9E9E9
| 297533 ||  || — || March 26, 2001 || Haleakala || NEAT || — || align=right | 1.8 km || 
|-id=534 bgcolor=#E9E9E9
| 297534 ||  || — || April 24, 2001 || Kitt Peak || Spacewatch || — || align=right | 2.3 km || 
|-id=535 bgcolor=#FA8072
| 297535 ||  || — || April 24, 2001 || Socorro || LINEAR || — || align=right | 1.1 km || 
|-id=536 bgcolor=#E9E9E9
| 297536 ||  || — || May 17, 2001 || Socorro || LINEAR || — || align=right | 3.1 km || 
|-id=537 bgcolor=#E9E9E9
| 297537 ||  || — || May 21, 2001 || Socorro || LINEAR || — || align=right | 2.5 km || 
|-id=538 bgcolor=#fefefe
| 297538 ||  || — || July 20, 2001 || Palomar || NEAT || — || align=right | 1.1 km || 
|-id=539 bgcolor=#FA8072
| 297539 ||  || — || July 21, 2001 || Palomar || NEAT || — || align=right data-sort-value="0.70" | 700 m || 
|-id=540 bgcolor=#d6d6d6
| 297540 ||  || — || August 11, 2001 || Palomar || NEAT || — || align=right | 3.3 km || 
|-id=541 bgcolor=#fefefe
| 297541 ||  || — || August 11, 2001 || Haleakala || NEAT || — || align=right | 1.2 km || 
|-id=542 bgcolor=#fefefe
| 297542 ||  || — || August 14, 2001 || Haleakala || NEAT || FLO || align=right data-sort-value="0.59" | 590 m || 
|-id=543 bgcolor=#fefefe
| 297543 ||  || — || August 16, 2001 || Socorro || LINEAR || — || align=right data-sort-value="0.90" | 900 m || 
|-id=544 bgcolor=#fefefe
| 297544 ||  || — || August 19, 2001 || Socorro || LINEAR || FLO || align=right data-sort-value="0.71" | 710 m || 
|-id=545 bgcolor=#d6d6d6
| 297545 ||  || — || August 20, 2001 || Socorro || LINEAR || TRP || align=right | 4.1 km || 
|-id=546 bgcolor=#d6d6d6
| 297546 ||  || — || August 21, 2001 || Kitt Peak || Spacewatch || KOR || align=right | 1.7 km || 
|-id=547 bgcolor=#d6d6d6
| 297547 ||  || — || August 24, 2001 || Kitt Peak || Spacewatch || KOR || align=right | 1.5 km || 
|-id=548 bgcolor=#d6d6d6
| 297548 ||  || — || August 23, 2001 || Anderson Mesa || LONEOS || — || align=right | 3.1 km || 
|-id=549 bgcolor=#fefefe
| 297549 ||  || — || August 23, 2001 || Anderson Mesa || LONEOS || — || align=right data-sort-value="0.77" | 770 m || 
|-id=550 bgcolor=#fefefe
| 297550 ||  || — || August 23, 2001 || Anderson Mesa || LONEOS || — || align=right | 1.2 km || 
|-id=551 bgcolor=#E9E9E9
| 297551 ||  || — || August 24, 2001 || Anderson Mesa || LONEOS || — || align=right | 4.0 km || 
|-id=552 bgcolor=#fefefe
| 297552 ||  || — || August 24, 2001 || Anderson Mesa || LONEOS || — || align=right data-sort-value="0.84" | 840 m || 
|-id=553 bgcolor=#d6d6d6
| 297553 ||  || — || August 24, 2001 || Socorro || LINEAR || CHA || align=right | 3.4 km || 
|-id=554 bgcolor=#d6d6d6
| 297554 ||  || — || August 19, 2001 || Socorro || LINEAR || BRA || align=right | 2.0 km || 
|-id=555 bgcolor=#fefefe
| 297555 ||  || — || August 19, 2001 || Socorro || LINEAR || — || align=right | 1.0 km || 
|-id=556 bgcolor=#d6d6d6
| 297556 ||  || — || August 18, 2001 || Anderson Mesa || LONEOS || BRA || align=right | 2.2 km || 
|-id=557 bgcolor=#d6d6d6
| 297557 ||  || — || August 24, 2001 || Anderson Mesa || LONEOS || CHA || align=right | 3.3 km || 
|-id=558 bgcolor=#fefefe
| 297558 ||  || — || August 25, 2001 || Socorro || LINEAR || — || align=right data-sort-value="0.78" | 780 m || 
|-id=559 bgcolor=#d6d6d6
| 297559 ||  || — || August 26, 2001 || Palomar || NEAT || — || align=right | 3.8 km || 
|-id=560 bgcolor=#fefefe
| 297560 ||  || — || September 7, 2001 || Socorro || LINEAR || — || align=right data-sort-value="0.89" | 890 m || 
|-id=561 bgcolor=#fefefe
| 297561 ||  || — || September 8, 2001 || Socorro || LINEAR || — || align=right | 1.0 km || 
|-id=562 bgcolor=#fefefe
| 297562 ||  || — || September 7, 2001 || Socorro || LINEAR || — || align=right data-sort-value="0.73" | 730 m || 
|-id=563 bgcolor=#fefefe
| 297563 ||  || — || September 7, 2001 || Socorro || LINEAR || — || align=right data-sort-value="0.81" | 810 m || 
|-id=564 bgcolor=#fefefe
| 297564 ||  || — || September 7, 2001 || Socorro || LINEAR || — || align=right data-sort-value="0.93" | 930 m || 
|-id=565 bgcolor=#fefefe
| 297565 ||  || — || September 8, 2001 || Socorro || LINEAR || FLO || align=right data-sort-value="0.67" | 670 m || 
|-id=566 bgcolor=#fefefe
| 297566 ||  || — || September 12, 2001 || Socorro || LINEAR || — || align=right data-sort-value="0.81" | 810 m || 
|-id=567 bgcolor=#fefefe
| 297567 ||  || — || September 10, 2001 || Socorro || LINEAR || — || align=right data-sort-value="0.90" | 900 m || 
|-id=568 bgcolor=#fefefe
| 297568 ||  || — || September 11, 2001 || Anderson Mesa || LONEOS || — || align=right data-sort-value="0.96" | 960 m || 
|-id=569 bgcolor=#fefefe
| 297569 ||  || — || September 11, 2001 || Anderson Mesa || LONEOS || FLO || align=right data-sort-value="0.85" | 850 m || 
|-id=570 bgcolor=#d6d6d6
| 297570 ||  || — || September 12, 2001 || Kitt Peak || Spacewatch || — || align=right | 2.7 km || 
|-id=571 bgcolor=#fefefe
| 297571 ||  || — || September 8, 2001 || Socorro || LINEAR || H || align=right data-sort-value="0.91" | 910 m || 
|-id=572 bgcolor=#d6d6d6
| 297572 ||  || — || September 12, 2001 || Socorro || LINEAR || KAR || align=right | 1.7 km || 
|-id=573 bgcolor=#d6d6d6
| 297573 ||  || — || September 12, 2001 || Socorro || LINEAR || — || align=right | 2.9 km || 
|-id=574 bgcolor=#fefefe
| 297574 ||  || — || September 12, 2001 || Socorro || LINEAR || — || align=right data-sort-value="0.92" | 920 m || 
|-id=575 bgcolor=#fefefe
| 297575 ||  || — || September 12, 2001 || Socorro || LINEAR || — || align=right | 1.1 km || 
|-id=576 bgcolor=#fefefe
| 297576 ||  || — || September 12, 2001 || Socorro || LINEAR || — || align=right data-sort-value="0.73" | 730 m || 
|-id=577 bgcolor=#d6d6d6
| 297577 ||  || — || September 12, 2001 || Socorro || LINEAR || BRA || align=right | 2.3 km || 
|-id=578 bgcolor=#fefefe
| 297578 ||  || — || September 15, 2001 || Palomar || NEAT || — || align=right | 1.1 km || 
|-id=579 bgcolor=#fefefe
| 297579 ||  || — || September 17, 2001 || Desert Eagle || W. K. Y. Yeung || FLO || align=right data-sort-value="0.65" | 650 m || 
|-id=580 bgcolor=#fefefe
| 297580 ||  || — || September 18, 2001 || Kitt Peak || Spacewatch || — || align=right data-sort-value="0.79" | 790 m || 
|-id=581 bgcolor=#d6d6d6
| 297581 ||  || — || September 16, 2001 || Socorro || LINEAR || — || align=right | 3.1 km || 
|-id=582 bgcolor=#d6d6d6
| 297582 ||  || — || September 16, 2001 || Socorro || LINEAR || — || align=right | 3.0 km || 
|-id=583 bgcolor=#fefefe
| 297583 ||  || — || September 16, 2001 || Socorro || LINEAR || FLO || align=right data-sort-value="0.77" | 770 m || 
|-id=584 bgcolor=#fefefe
| 297584 ||  || — || September 16, 2001 || Socorro || LINEAR || — || align=right data-sort-value="0.95" | 950 m || 
|-id=585 bgcolor=#fefefe
| 297585 ||  || — || September 17, 2001 || Socorro || LINEAR || H || align=right data-sort-value="0.98" | 980 m || 
|-id=586 bgcolor=#fefefe
| 297586 ||  || — || September 17, 2001 || Socorro || LINEAR || — || align=right | 1.0 km || 
|-id=587 bgcolor=#d6d6d6
| 297587 ||  || — || September 19, 2001 || Socorro || LINEAR || KOR || align=right | 1.7 km || 
|-id=588 bgcolor=#fefefe
| 297588 ||  || — || September 20, 2001 || Socorro || LINEAR || — || align=right data-sort-value="0.98" | 980 m || 
|-id=589 bgcolor=#fefefe
| 297589 ||  || — || September 20, 2001 || Socorro || LINEAR || — || align=right | 1.0 km || 
|-id=590 bgcolor=#d6d6d6
| 297590 ||  || — || September 20, 2001 || Socorro || LINEAR || — || align=right | 2.9 km || 
|-id=591 bgcolor=#d6d6d6
| 297591 ||  || — || September 20, 2001 || Socorro || LINEAR || — || align=right | 1.7 km || 
|-id=592 bgcolor=#d6d6d6
| 297592 ||  || — || September 20, 2001 || Socorro || LINEAR || — || align=right | 3.4 km || 
|-id=593 bgcolor=#d6d6d6
| 297593 ||  || — || September 20, 2001 || Socorro || LINEAR || — || align=right | 3.1 km || 
|-id=594 bgcolor=#d6d6d6
| 297594 ||  || — || September 20, 2001 || Socorro || LINEAR || — || align=right | 3.0 km || 
|-id=595 bgcolor=#fefefe
| 297595 ||  || — || September 16, 2001 || Socorro || LINEAR || FLO || align=right data-sort-value="0.96" | 960 m || 
|-id=596 bgcolor=#d6d6d6
| 297596 ||  || — || September 17, 2001 || Socorro || LINEAR || — || align=right | 3.5 km || 
|-id=597 bgcolor=#fefefe
| 297597 ||  || — || September 17, 2001 || Socorro || LINEAR || FLO || align=right data-sort-value="0.77" | 770 m || 
|-id=598 bgcolor=#d6d6d6
| 297598 ||  || — || September 19, 2001 || Socorro || LINEAR || TRE || align=right | 2.7 km || 
|-id=599 bgcolor=#d6d6d6
| 297599 ||  || — || September 19, 2001 || Socorro || LINEAR || KOR || align=right | 1.5 km || 
|-id=600 bgcolor=#fefefe
| 297600 ||  || — || September 19, 2001 || Socorro || LINEAR || — || align=right data-sort-value="0.70" | 700 m || 
|}

297601–297700 

|-bgcolor=#d6d6d6
| 297601 ||  || — || September 19, 2001 || Socorro || LINEAR || — || align=right | 2.2 km || 
|-id=602 bgcolor=#fefefe
| 297602 ||  || — || September 19, 2001 || Socorro || LINEAR || FLO || align=right data-sort-value="0.75" | 750 m || 
|-id=603 bgcolor=#fefefe
| 297603 ||  || — || September 19, 2001 || Socorro || LINEAR || — || align=right data-sort-value="0.98" | 980 m || 
|-id=604 bgcolor=#d6d6d6
| 297604 ||  || — || September 19, 2001 || Socorro || LINEAR || — || align=right | 2.8 km || 
|-id=605 bgcolor=#d6d6d6
| 297605 ||  || — || September 19, 2001 || Socorro || LINEAR || KOR || align=right | 1.9 km || 
|-id=606 bgcolor=#d6d6d6
| 297606 ||  || — || September 19, 2001 || Socorro || LINEAR || KOR || align=right | 2.3 km || 
|-id=607 bgcolor=#fefefe
| 297607 ||  || — || September 19, 2001 || Socorro || LINEAR || — || align=right data-sort-value="0.75" | 750 m || 
|-id=608 bgcolor=#fefefe
| 297608 ||  || — || September 19, 2001 || Socorro || LINEAR || — || align=right data-sort-value="0.69" | 690 m || 
|-id=609 bgcolor=#d6d6d6
| 297609 ||  || — || September 20, 2001 || Kitt Peak || Spacewatch || NAE || align=right | 3.3 km || 
|-id=610 bgcolor=#d6d6d6
| 297610 ||  || — || September 20, 2001 || Socorro || LINEAR || — || align=right | 3.1 km || 
|-id=611 bgcolor=#fefefe
| 297611 ||  || — || September 21, 2001 || Socorro || LINEAR || — || align=right data-sort-value="0.73" | 730 m || 
|-id=612 bgcolor=#FA8072
| 297612 ||  || — || September 19, 2001 || Anderson Mesa || LONEOS || — || align=right data-sort-value="0.69" | 690 m || 
|-id=613 bgcolor=#d6d6d6
| 297613 ||  || — || September 25, 2001 || Socorro || LINEAR || — || align=right | 3.9 km || 
|-id=614 bgcolor=#fefefe
| 297614 ||  || — || September 28, 2001 || Palomar || NEAT || — || align=right data-sort-value="0.93" | 930 m || 
|-id=615 bgcolor=#fefefe
| 297615 ||  || — || September 17, 2001 || Anderson Mesa || LONEOS || — || align=right data-sort-value="0.92" | 920 m || 
|-id=616 bgcolor=#fefefe
| 297616 ||  || — || October 7, 2001 || Palomar || NEAT || — || align=right | 2.2 km || 
|-id=617 bgcolor=#fefefe
| 297617 ||  || — || October 12, 2001 || Campo Imperatore || CINEOS || FLO || align=right data-sort-value="0.83" | 830 m || 
|-id=618 bgcolor=#fefefe
| 297618 ||  || — || October 13, 2001 || Socorro || LINEAR || FLO || align=right data-sort-value="0.71" | 710 m || 
|-id=619 bgcolor=#d6d6d6
| 297619 ||  || — || October 14, 2001 || Socorro || LINEAR || — || align=right | 4.1 km || 
|-id=620 bgcolor=#fefefe
| 297620 ||  || — || October 14, 2001 || Socorro || LINEAR || FLO || align=right data-sort-value="0.75" | 750 m || 
|-id=621 bgcolor=#d6d6d6
| 297621 ||  || — || October 14, 2001 || Socorro || LINEAR || — || align=right | 3.9 km || 
|-id=622 bgcolor=#fefefe
| 297622 ||  || — || October 14, 2001 || Socorro || LINEAR || PHO || align=right | 1.8 km || 
|-id=623 bgcolor=#fefefe
| 297623 ||  || — || October 13, 2001 || Socorro || LINEAR || — || align=right data-sort-value="0.85" | 850 m || 
|-id=624 bgcolor=#fefefe
| 297624 ||  || — || October 13, 2001 || Socorro || LINEAR || V || align=right data-sort-value="0.73" | 730 m || 
|-id=625 bgcolor=#d6d6d6
| 297625 ||  || — || October 13, 2001 || Socorro || LINEAR || — || align=right | 3.7 km || 
|-id=626 bgcolor=#d6d6d6
| 297626 ||  || — || October 13, 2001 || Socorro || LINEAR || — || align=right | 2.8 km || 
|-id=627 bgcolor=#d6d6d6
| 297627 ||  || — || October 14, 2001 || Socorro || LINEAR || CHA || align=right | 3.7 km || 
|-id=628 bgcolor=#fefefe
| 297628 ||  || — || October 14, 2001 || Socorro || LINEAR || FLO || align=right data-sort-value="0.75" | 750 m || 
|-id=629 bgcolor=#fefefe
| 297629 ||  || — || October 14, 2001 || Socorro || LINEAR || — || align=right | 1.1 km || 
|-id=630 bgcolor=#fefefe
| 297630 ||  || — || October 14, 2001 || Socorro || LINEAR || — || align=right data-sort-value="0.87" | 870 m || 
|-id=631 bgcolor=#fefefe
| 297631 ||  || — || October 14, 2001 || Socorro || LINEAR || — || align=right | 1.1 km || 
|-id=632 bgcolor=#fefefe
| 297632 ||  || — || October 14, 2001 || Socorro || LINEAR || — || align=right data-sort-value="0.72" | 720 m || 
|-id=633 bgcolor=#d6d6d6
| 297633 ||  || — || October 14, 2001 || Socorro || LINEAR || — || align=right | 3.4 km || 
|-id=634 bgcolor=#d6d6d6
| 297634 ||  || — || October 14, 2001 || Socorro || LINEAR || — || align=right | 4.4 km || 
|-id=635 bgcolor=#fefefe
| 297635 ||  || — || October 15, 2001 || Socorro || LINEAR || — || align=right | 1.0 km || 
|-id=636 bgcolor=#d6d6d6
| 297636 ||  || — || October 15, 2001 || Kitt Peak || Spacewatch || THM || align=right | 3.0 km || 
|-id=637 bgcolor=#fefefe
| 297637 ||  || — || October 10, 2001 || Palomar || NEAT || — || align=right data-sort-value="0.87" | 870 m || 
|-id=638 bgcolor=#fefefe
| 297638 ||  || — || October 10, 2001 || Palomar || NEAT || — || align=right | 1.1 km || 
|-id=639 bgcolor=#d6d6d6
| 297639 ||  || — || October 10, 2001 || Palomar || NEAT || — || align=right | 2.9 km || 
|-id=640 bgcolor=#d6d6d6
| 297640 ||  || — || October 15, 2001 || Palomar || NEAT || EOS || align=right | 3.0 km || 
|-id=641 bgcolor=#d6d6d6
| 297641 ||  || — || October 13, 2001 || Kitt Peak || Spacewatch || — || align=right | 3.3 km || 
|-id=642 bgcolor=#d6d6d6
| 297642 ||  || — || October 14, 2001 || Kitt Peak || Spacewatch || TEL || align=right | 1.8 km || 
|-id=643 bgcolor=#fefefe
| 297643 ||  || — || October 11, 2001 || Palomar || NEAT || — || align=right data-sort-value="0.94" | 940 m || 
|-id=644 bgcolor=#C2FFFF
| 297644 ||  || — || October 14, 2001 || Socorro || LINEAR || L5 || align=right | 12 km || 
|-id=645 bgcolor=#fefefe
| 297645 ||  || — || October 14, 2001 || Socorro || LINEAR || FLO || align=right data-sort-value="0.75" | 750 m || 
|-id=646 bgcolor=#fefefe
| 297646 ||  || — || October 14, 2001 || Socorro || LINEAR || PHO || align=right | 1.3 km || 
|-id=647 bgcolor=#d6d6d6
| 297647 ||  || — || October 11, 2001 || Socorro || LINEAR || — || align=right | 2.8 km || 
|-id=648 bgcolor=#fefefe
| 297648 ||  || — || October 11, 2001 || Socorro || LINEAR || FLO || align=right data-sort-value="0.76" | 760 m || 
|-id=649 bgcolor=#fefefe
| 297649 ||  || — || October 11, 2001 || Socorro || LINEAR || — || align=right data-sort-value="0.90" | 900 m || 
|-id=650 bgcolor=#d6d6d6
| 297650 ||  || — || October 13, 2001 || Anderson Mesa || LONEOS || — || align=right | 4.2 km || 
|-id=651 bgcolor=#d6d6d6
| 297651 ||  || — || October 13, 2001 || Palomar || NEAT || — || align=right | 5.4 km || 
|-id=652 bgcolor=#d6d6d6
| 297652 ||  || — || October 15, 2001 || Kitt Peak || Spacewatch || — || align=right | 2.8 km || 
|-id=653 bgcolor=#d6d6d6
| 297653 ||  || — || October 15, 2001 || Kitt Peak || Spacewatch || — || align=right | 3.6 km || 
|-id=654 bgcolor=#fefefe
| 297654 ||  || — || October 15, 2001 || Palomar || NEAT || FLO || align=right data-sort-value="0.80" | 800 m || 
|-id=655 bgcolor=#fefefe
| 297655 ||  || — || October 11, 2001 || Palomar || NEAT || FLO || align=right data-sort-value="0.83" | 830 m || 
|-id=656 bgcolor=#fefefe
| 297656 ||  || — || October 14, 2001 || Apache Point || SDSS || V || align=right data-sort-value="0.71" | 710 m || 
|-id=657 bgcolor=#fefefe
| 297657 ||  || — || October 10, 2001 || Palomar || NEAT || — || align=right data-sort-value="0.74" | 740 m || 
|-id=658 bgcolor=#d6d6d6
| 297658 ||  || — || October 8, 2001 || Palomar || NEAT || — || align=right | 3.0 km || 
|-id=659 bgcolor=#d6d6d6
| 297659 ||  || — || October 11, 2001 || Palomar || NEAT || — || align=right | 3.5 km || 
|-id=660 bgcolor=#d6d6d6
| 297660 ||  || — || October 18, 2001 || Socorro || LINEAR || — || align=right | 4.1 km || 
|-id=661 bgcolor=#fefefe
| 297661 ||  || — || October 16, 2001 || Socorro || LINEAR || — || align=right data-sort-value="0.90" | 900 m || 
|-id=662 bgcolor=#d6d6d6
| 297662 ||  || — || October 16, 2001 || Socorro || LINEAR || — || align=right | 3.4 km || 
|-id=663 bgcolor=#fefefe
| 297663 ||  || — || October 17, 2001 || Socorro || LINEAR || — || align=right data-sort-value="0.89" | 890 m || 
|-id=664 bgcolor=#d6d6d6
| 297664 ||  || — || October 17, 2001 || Socorro || LINEAR || THM || align=right | 3.0 km || 
|-id=665 bgcolor=#d6d6d6
| 297665 ||  || — || October 17, 2001 || Socorro || LINEAR || — || align=right | 3.8 km || 
|-id=666 bgcolor=#fefefe
| 297666 ||  || — || October 20, 2001 || Socorro || LINEAR || NYS || align=right data-sort-value="0.75" | 750 m || 
|-id=667 bgcolor=#d6d6d6
| 297667 ||  || — || October 20, 2001 || Socorro || LINEAR || — || align=right | 3.5 km || 
|-id=668 bgcolor=#d6d6d6
| 297668 ||  || — || October 20, 2001 || Socorro || LINEAR || — || align=right | 5.2 km || 
|-id=669 bgcolor=#d6d6d6
| 297669 ||  || — || October 20, 2001 || Socorro || LINEAR || — || align=right | 5.5 km || 
|-id=670 bgcolor=#fefefe
| 297670 ||  || — || October 20, 2001 || Socorro || LINEAR || — || align=right data-sort-value="0.89" | 890 m || 
|-id=671 bgcolor=#fefefe
| 297671 ||  || — || October 21, 2001 || Kitt Peak || Spacewatch || — || align=right data-sort-value="0.73" | 730 m || 
|-id=672 bgcolor=#fefefe
| 297672 ||  || — || October 19, 2001 || Palomar || NEAT || FLO || align=right data-sort-value="0.70" | 700 m || 
|-id=673 bgcolor=#fefefe
| 297673 ||  || — || October 20, 2001 || Socorro || LINEAR || — || align=right data-sort-value="0.94" | 940 m || 
|-id=674 bgcolor=#d6d6d6
| 297674 ||  || — || October 22, 2001 || Socorro || LINEAR || — || align=right | 4.3 km || 
|-id=675 bgcolor=#fefefe
| 297675 ||  || — || October 22, 2001 || Socorro || LINEAR || — || align=right data-sort-value="0.85" | 850 m || 
|-id=676 bgcolor=#fefefe
| 297676 ||  || — || October 20, 2001 || Socorro || LINEAR || — || align=right data-sort-value="0.96" | 960 m || 
|-id=677 bgcolor=#d6d6d6
| 297677 ||  || — || October 22, 2001 || Socorro || LINEAR || — || align=right | 3.7 km || 
|-id=678 bgcolor=#fefefe
| 297678 ||  || — || October 23, 2001 || Socorro || LINEAR || — || align=right | 1.2 km || 
|-id=679 bgcolor=#fefefe
| 297679 ||  || — || October 23, 2001 || Socorro || LINEAR || NYS || align=right data-sort-value="0.67" | 670 m || 
|-id=680 bgcolor=#d6d6d6
| 297680 ||  || — || October 23, 2001 || Socorro || LINEAR || — || align=right | 4.2 km || 
|-id=681 bgcolor=#d6d6d6
| 297681 ||  || — || October 23, 2001 || Socorro || LINEAR || — || align=right | 2.4 km || 
|-id=682 bgcolor=#d6d6d6
| 297682 ||  || — || October 23, 2001 || Socorro || LINEAR || JLI || align=right | 4.5 km || 
|-id=683 bgcolor=#d6d6d6
| 297683 ||  || — || October 21, 2001 || Socorro || LINEAR || — || align=right | 3.6 km || 
|-id=684 bgcolor=#fefefe
| 297684 ||  || — || October 18, 2001 || Palomar || NEAT || FLO || align=right data-sort-value="0.88" | 880 m || 
|-id=685 bgcolor=#fefefe
| 297685 ||  || — || October 19, 2001 || Palomar || NEAT || — || align=right data-sort-value="0.72" | 720 m || 
|-id=686 bgcolor=#d6d6d6
| 297686 ||  || — || October 16, 2001 || Kitt Peak || Spacewatch || TRE || align=right | 2.8 km || 
|-id=687 bgcolor=#fefefe
| 297687 ||  || — || October 19, 2001 || Palomar || NEAT || — || align=right | 1.0 km || 
|-id=688 bgcolor=#fefefe
| 297688 ||  || — || October 20, 2001 || Socorro || LINEAR || — || align=right data-sort-value="0.95" | 950 m || 
|-id=689 bgcolor=#fefefe
| 297689 ||  || — || October 20, 2001 || Socorro || LINEAR || FLO || align=right data-sort-value="0.64" | 640 m || 
|-id=690 bgcolor=#d6d6d6
| 297690 ||  || — || October 24, 2001 || Kitt Peak || Spacewatch || — || align=right | 3.0 km || 
|-id=691 bgcolor=#fefefe
| 297691 ||  || — || October 21, 2001 || Socorro || LINEAR || FLO || align=right data-sort-value="0.83" | 830 m || 
|-id=692 bgcolor=#C2FFFF
| 297692 ||  || — || October 29, 2001 || Palomar || NEAT || L5 || align=right | 12 km || 
|-id=693 bgcolor=#d6d6d6
| 297693 ||  || — || October 25, 2001 || Apache Point || SDSS || — || align=right | 3.0 km || 
|-id=694 bgcolor=#d6d6d6
| 297694 ||  || — || October 16, 2001 || Palomar || NEAT || — || align=right | 3.3 km || 
|-id=695 bgcolor=#FA8072
| 297695 ||  || — || November 9, 2001 || Socorro || LINEAR || — || align=right data-sort-value="0.95" | 950 m || 
|-id=696 bgcolor=#fefefe
| 297696 ||  || — || November 9, 2001 || Socorro || LINEAR || — || align=right | 1.1 km || 
|-id=697 bgcolor=#d6d6d6
| 297697 ||  || — || November 9, 2001 || Socorro || LINEAR || — || align=right | 3.9 km || 
|-id=698 bgcolor=#fefefe
| 297698 ||  || — || November 9, 2001 || Socorro || LINEAR || FLO || align=right data-sort-value="0.83" | 830 m || 
|-id=699 bgcolor=#d6d6d6
| 297699 ||  || — || November 10, 2001 || Socorro || LINEAR || — || align=right | 5.0 km || 
|-id=700 bgcolor=#fefefe
| 297700 ||  || — || November 10, 2001 || Socorro || LINEAR || — || align=right data-sort-value="0.89" | 890 m || 
|}

297701–297800 

|-bgcolor=#E9E9E9
| 297701 ||  || — || November 7, 2001 || Palomar || NEAT || — || align=right | 4.0 km || 
|-id=702 bgcolor=#fefefe
| 297702 ||  || — || November 14, 2001 || Kitt Peak || Spacewatch || — || align=right data-sort-value="0.68" | 680 m || 
|-id=703 bgcolor=#fefefe
| 297703 ||  || — || November 9, 2001 || Palomar || NEAT || NYS || align=right data-sort-value="0.85" | 850 m || 
|-id=704 bgcolor=#d6d6d6
| 297704 ||  || — || November 10, 2001 || Socorro || LINEAR || — || align=right | 3.7 km || 
|-id=705 bgcolor=#d6d6d6
| 297705 ||  || — || November 10, 2001 || Socorro || LINEAR || EOS || align=right | 2.1 km || 
|-id=706 bgcolor=#d6d6d6
| 297706 ||  || — || November 15, 2001 || Socorro || LINEAR || — || align=right | 3.5 km || 
|-id=707 bgcolor=#d6d6d6
| 297707 ||  || — || November 15, 2001 || Socorro || LINEAR || — || align=right | 3.6 km || 
|-id=708 bgcolor=#fefefe
| 297708 ||  || — || November 12, 2001 || Socorro || LINEAR || NYS || align=right data-sort-value="0.78" | 780 m || 
|-id=709 bgcolor=#fefefe
| 297709 ||  || — || November 12, 2001 || Socorro || LINEAR || V || align=right data-sort-value="0.76" | 760 m || 
|-id=710 bgcolor=#d6d6d6
| 297710 ||  || — || November 12, 2001 || Socorro || LINEAR || EOS || align=right | 2.9 km || 
|-id=711 bgcolor=#fefefe
| 297711 ||  || — || November 12, 2001 || Socorro || LINEAR || — || align=right | 1.2 km || 
|-id=712 bgcolor=#fefefe
| 297712 ||  || — || November 12, 2001 || Socorro || LINEAR || — || align=right | 1.1 km || 
|-id=713 bgcolor=#fefefe
| 297713 ||  || — || November 15, 2001 || Palomar || NEAT || FLO || align=right data-sort-value="0.89" | 890 m || 
|-id=714 bgcolor=#fefefe
| 297714 ||  || — || November 10, 2001 || Palomar || NEAT || — || align=right | 1.1 km || 
|-id=715 bgcolor=#d6d6d6
| 297715 ||  || — || November 10, 2001 || Palomar || NEAT || HYG || align=right | 3.5 km || 
|-id=716 bgcolor=#d6d6d6
| 297716 ||  || — || November 12, 2001 || Socorro || LINEAR || — || align=right | 3.5 km || 
|-id=717 bgcolor=#fefefe
| 297717 ||  || — || November 15, 2001 || Kitt Peak || Spacewatch || V || align=right data-sort-value="0.72" | 720 m || 
|-id=718 bgcolor=#d6d6d6
| 297718 ||  || — || November 17, 2001 || Socorro || LINEAR || — || align=right | 3.9 km || 
|-id=719 bgcolor=#d6d6d6
| 297719 ||  || — || November 17, 2001 || Socorro || LINEAR || — || align=right | 2.5 km || 
|-id=720 bgcolor=#fefefe
| 297720 ||  || — || November 25, 2001 || Pla D'Arguines || R. Ferrando || — || align=right | 1.3 km || 
|-id=721 bgcolor=#d6d6d6
| 297721 ||  || — || November 17, 2001 || Socorro || LINEAR || — || align=right | 3.1 km || 
|-id=722 bgcolor=#fefefe
| 297722 ||  || — || November 17, 2001 || Socorro || LINEAR || — || align=right data-sort-value="0.82" | 820 m || 
|-id=723 bgcolor=#fefefe
| 297723 ||  || — || November 16, 2001 || Kitt Peak || Spacewatch || — || align=right data-sort-value="0.79" | 790 m || 
|-id=724 bgcolor=#fefefe
| 297724 ||  || — || November 17, 2001 || Socorro || LINEAR || — || align=right | 1.4 km || 
|-id=725 bgcolor=#fefefe
| 297725 ||  || — || November 17, 2001 || Socorro || LINEAR || FLO || align=right | 1.8 km || 
|-id=726 bgcolor=#d6d6d6
| 297726 ||  || — || November 17, 2001 || Socorro || LINEAR || — || align=right | 3.2 km || 
|-id=727 bgcolor=#d6d6d6
| 297727 ||  || — || November 17, 2001 || Socorro || LINEAR || EOS || align=right | 3.0 km || 
|-id=728 bgcolor=#d6d6d6
| 297728 ||  || — || November 17, 2001 || Socorro || LINEAR || — || align=right | 3.1 km || 
|-id=729 bgcolor=#fefefe
| 297729 ||  || — || November 18, 2001 || Socorro || LINEAR || — || align=right data-sort-value="0.61" | 610 m || 
|-id=730 bgcolor=#d6d6d6
| 297730 ||  || — || November 19, 2001 || Anderson Mesa || LONEOS || — || align=right | 4.1 km || 
|-id=731 bgcolor=#d6d6d6
| 297731 ||  || — || November 19, 2001 || Socorro || LINEAR || — || align=right | 3.5 km || 
|-id=732 bgcolor=#d6d6d6
| 297732 ||  || — || November 19, 2001 || Socorro || LINEAR || — || align=right | 3.0 km || 
|-id=733 bgcolor=#d6d6d6
| 297733 ||  || — || November 20, 2001 || Socorro || LINEAR || — || align=right | 2.9 km || 
|-id=734 bgcolor=#d6d6d6
| 297734 ||  || — || November 20, 2001 || Socorro || LINEAR || — || align=right | 2.7 km || 
|-id=735 bgcolor=#fefefe
| 297735 ||  || — || November 20, 2001 || Socorro || LINEAR || — || align=right data-sort-value="0.84" | 840 m || 
|-id=736 bgcolor=#d6d6d6
| 297736 ||  || — || November 17, 2001 || Kitt Peak || Spacewatch || — || align=right | 3.5 km || 
|-id=737 bgcolor=#fefefe
| 297737 ||  || — || December 8, 2001 || Socorro || LINEAR || PHO || align=right | 1.4 km || 
|-id=738 bgcolor=#d6d6d6
| 297738 ||  || — || December 8, 2001 || Socorro || LINEAR || ALA || align=right | 4.7 km || 
|-id=739 bgcolor=#d6d6d6
| 297739 ||  || — || December 10, 2001 || Kitt Peak || Spacewatch || — || align=right | 2.8 km || 
|-id=740 bgcolor=#fefefe
| 297740 ||  || — || December 9, 2001 || Socorro || LINEAR || H || align=right data-sort-value="0.98" | 980 m || 
|-id=741 bgcolor=#d6d6d6
| 297741 ||  || — || December 9, 2001 || Socorro || LINEAR || — || align=right | 3.9 km || 
|-id=742 bgcolor=#fefefe
| 297742 ||  || — || December 9, 2001 || Socorro || LINEAR || — || align=right | 1.1 km || 
|-id=743 bgcolor=#d6d6d6
| 297743 ||  || — || December 9, 2001 || Socorro || LINEAR || — || align=right | 5.0 km || 
|-id=744 bgcolor=#d6d6d6
| 297744 ||  || — || December 9, 2001 || Socorro || LINEAR || — || align=right | 3.8 km || 
|-id=745 bgcolor=#fefefe
| 297745 ||  || — || December 9, 2001 || Socorro || LINEAR || NYS || align=right data-sort-value="0.78" | 780 m || 
|-id=746 bgcolor=#d6d6d6
| 297746 ||  || — || December 10, 2001 || Socorro || LINEAR || — || align=right | 3.6 km || 
|-id=747 bgcolor=#fefefe
| 297747 ||  || — || December 13, 2001 || Palomar || NEAT || — || align=right data-sort-value="0.79" | 790 m || 
|-id=748 bgcolor=#d6d6d6
| 297748 ||  || — || December 9, 2001 || Socorro || LINEAR || — || align=right | 4.2 km || 
|-id=749 bgcolor=#d6d6d6
| 297749 ||  || — || December 9, 2001 || Socorro || LINEAR || EOS || align=right | 2.7 km || 
|-id=750 bgcolor=#fefefe
| 297750 ||  || — || December 10, 2001 || Socorro || LINEAR || — || align=right | 1.2 km || 
|-id=751 bgcolor=#d6d6d6
| 297751 ||  || — || December 10, 2001 || Socorro || LINEAR || — || align=right | 4.9 km || 
|-id=752 bgcolor=#d6d6d6
| 297752 ||  || — || December 11, 2001 || Socorro || LINEAR || — || align=right | 5.0 km || 
|-id=753 bgcolor=#d6d6d6
| 297753 ||  || — || December 11, 2001 || Socorro || LINEAR || — || align=right | 3.6 km || 
|-id=754 bgcolor=#d6d6d6
| 297754 ||  || — || December 11, 2001 || Socorro || LINEAR || — || align=right | 4.2 km || 
|-id=755 bgcolor=#fefefe
| 297755 ||  || — || December 11, 2001 || Socorro || LINEAR || — || align=right | 1.2 km || 
|-id=756 bgcolor=#d6d6d6
| 297756 ||  || — || December 10, 2001 || Socorro || LINEAR || — || align=right | 3.8 km || 
|-id=757 bgcolor=#fefefe
| 297757 ||  || — || December 10, 2001 || Socorro || LINEAR || FLO || align=right | 1.0 km || 
|-id=758 bgcolor=#fefefe
| 297758 ||  || — || December 10, 2001 || Socorro || LINEAR || V || align=right data-sort-value="0.87" | 870 m || 
|-id=759 bgcolor=#d6d6d6
| 297759 ||  || — || December 11, 2001 || Socorro || LINEAR || — || align=right | 4.1 km || 
|-id=760 bgcolor=#d6d6d6
| 297760 ||  || — || December 14, 2001 || Socorro || LINEAR || EOS || align=right | 2.6 km || 
|-id=761 bgcolor=#d6d6d6
| 297761 ||  || — || December 14, 2001 || Socorro || LINEAR || — || align=right | 2.5 km || 
|-id=762 bgcolor=#d6d6d6
| 297762 ||  || — || December 14, 2001 || Socorro || LINEAR || — || align=right | 4.4 km || 
|-id=763 bgcolor=#d6d6d6
| 297763 ||  || — || December 14, 2001 || Socorro || LINEAR || — || align=right | 3.0 km || 
|-id=764 bgcolor=#fefefe
| 297764 ||  || — || December 14, 2001 || Socorro || LINEAR || FLO || align=right | 1.1 km || 
|-id=765 bgcolor=#fefefe
| 297765 ||  || — || December 14, 2001 || Socorro || LINEAR || FLO || align=right data-sort-value="0.76" | 760 m || 
|-id=766 bgcolor=#fefefe
| 297766 ||  || — || December 14, 2001 || Socorro || LINEAR || NYS || align=right data-sort-value="0.69" | 690 m || 
|-id=767 bgcolor=#d6d6d6
| 297767 ||  || — || December 14, 2001 || Socorro || LINEAR || — || align=right | 3.5 km || 
|-id=768 bgcolor=#fefefe
| 297768 ||  || — || December 14, 2001 || Socorro || LINEAR || — || align=right data-sort-value="0.91" | 910 m || 
|-id=769 bgcolor=#fefefe
| 297769 ||  || — || December 14, 2001 || Socorro || LINEAR || NYS || align=right | 1.0 km || 
|-id=770 bgcolor=#fefefe
| 297770 ||  || — || December 14, 2001 || Socorro || LINEAR || — || align=right | 1.5 km || 
|-id=771 bgcolor=#d6d6d6
| 297771 ||  || — || December 14, 2001 || Socorro || LINEAR || — || align=right | 4.0 km || 
|-id=772 bgcolor=#fefefe
| 297772 ||  || — || December 14, 2001 || Socorro || LINEAR || NYS || align=right data-sort-value="0.95" | 950 m || 
|-id=773 bgcolor=#fefefe
| 297773 ||  || — || December 14, 2001 || Socorro || LINEAR || FLO || align=right data-sort-value="0.89" | 890 m || 
|-id=774 bgcolor=#fefefe
| 297774 ||  || — || December 14, 2001 || Socorro || LINEAR || NYS || align=right data-sort-value="0.76" | 760 m || 
|-id=775 bgcolor=#d6d6d6
| 297775 ||  || — || December 14, 2001 || Socorro || LINEAR || — || align=right | 4.0 km || 
|-id=776 bgcolor=#fefefe
| 297776 ||  || — || December 15, 2001 || Socorro || LINEAR || NYS || align=right data-sort-value="0.64" | 640 m || 
|-id=777 bgcolor=#d6d6d6
| 297777 ||  || — || December 15, 2001 || Socorro || LINEAR || — || align=right | 4.1 km || 
|-id=778 bgcolor=#d6d6d6
| 297778 ||  || — || December 15, 2001 || Socorro || LINEAR || — || align=right | 3.1 km || 
|-id=779 bgcolor=#fefefe
| 297779 ||  || — || December 15, 2001 || Socorro || LINEAR || NYS || align=right data-sort-value="0.77" | 770 m || 
|-id=780 bgcolor=#d6d6d6
| 297780 ||  || — || December 15, 2001 || Socorro || LINEAR || — || align=right | 3.4 km || 
|-id=781 bgcolor=#fefefe
| 297781 ||  || — || December 15, 2001 || Socorro || LINEAR || V || align=right data-sort-value="0.83" | 830 m || 
|-id=782 bgcolor=#d6d6d6
| 297782 ||  || — || December 14, 2001 || Socorro || LINEAR || — || align=right | 2.6 km || 
|-id=783 bgcolor=#d6d6d6
| 297783 ||  || — || December 15, 2001 || Socorro || LINEAR || — || align=right | 4.3 km || 
|-id=784 bgcolor=#fefefe
| 297784 ||  || — || December 14, 2001 || Socorro || LINEAR || — || align=right data-sort-value="0.99" | 990 m || 
|-id=785 bgcolor=#fefefe
| 297785 ||  || — || December 14, 2001 || Socorro || LINEAR || — || align=right data-sort-value="0.80" | 800 m || 
|-id=786 bgcolor=#d6d6d6
| 297786 ||  || — || December 13, 2001 || Palomar || NEAT || — || align=right | 2.9 km || 
|-id=787 bgcolor=#fefefe
| 297787 ||  || — || December 17, 2001 || Socorro || LINEAR || — || align=right | 1.4 km || 
|-id=788 bgcolor=#d6d6d6
| 297788 ||  || — || December 17, 2001 || Socorro || LINEAR || — || align=right | 3.0 km || 
|-id=789 bgcolor=#d6d6d6
| 297789 ||  || — || December 17, 2001 || Socorro || LINEAR || — || align=right | 3.0 km || 
|-id=790 bgcolor=#d6d6d6
| 297790 ||  || — || December 17, 2001 || Socorro || LINEAR || URS || align=right | 4.3 km || 
|-id=791 bgcolor=#fefefe
| 297791 ||  || — || December 18, 2001 || Socorro || LINEAR || — || align=right data-sort-value="0.73" | 730 m || 
|-id=792 bgcolor=#fefefe
| 297792 ||  || — || December 18, 2001 || Socorro || LINEAR || — || align=right data-sort-value="0.87" | 870 m || 
|-id=793 bgcolor=#fefefe
| 297793 ||  || — || December 18, 2001 || Socorro || LINEAR || — || align=right | 1.2 km || 
|-id=794 bgcolor=#fefefe
| 297794 ||  || — || December 18, 2001 || Socorro || LINEAR || — || align=right | 1.2 km || 
|-id=795 bgcolor=#fefefe
| 297795 ||  || — || December 18, 2001 || Socorro || LINEAR || — || align=right data-sort-value="0.77" | 770 m || 
|-id=796 bgcolor=#fefefe
| 297796 ||  || — || December 18, 2001 || Socorro || LINEAR || V || align=right | 1.0 km || 
|-id=797 bgcolor=#fefefe
| 297797 ||  || — || December 18, 2001 || Socorro || LINEAR || NYS || align=right data-sort-value="0.83" | 830 m || 
|-id=798 bgcolor=#d6d6d6
| 297798 ||  || — || December 17, 2001 || Socorro || LINEAR || HYG || align=right | 3.9 km || 
|-id=799 bgcolor=#d6d6d6
| 297799 ||  || — || December 22, 2001 || Socorro || LINEAR || — || align=right | 3.6 km || 
|-id=800 bgcolor=#fefefe
| 297800 ||  || — || December 17, 2001 || Socorro || LINEAR || — || align=right data-sort-value="0.90" | 900 m || 
|}

297801–297900 

|-bgcolor=#fefefe
| 297801 ||  || — || December 17, 2001 || Socorro || LINEAR || — || align=right | 1.1 km || 
|-id=802 bgcolor=#fefefe
| 297802 ||  || — || December 17, 2001 || Palomar || NEAT || — || align=right data-sort-value="0.87" | 870 m || 
|-id=803 bgcolor=#d6d6d6
| 297803 ||  || — || January 9, 2002 || Cima Ekar || ADAS || VER || align=right | 3.7 km || 
|-id=804 bgcolor=#d6d6d6
| 297804 ||  || — || January 7, 2002 || Anderson Mesa || LONEOS || — || align=right | 3.8 km || 
|-id=805 bgcolor=#fefefe
| 297805 ||  || — || January 9, 2002 || Socorro || LINEAR || — || align=right data-sort-value="0.83" | 830 m || 
|-id=806 bgcolor=#fefefe
| 297806 ||  || — || January 9, 2002 || Socorro || LINEAR || H || align=right | 1.0 km || 
|-id=807 bgcolor=#d6d6d6
| 297807 ||  || — || January 9, 2002 || Socorro || LINEAR || — || align=right | 4.0 km || 
|-id=808 bgcolor=#d6d6d6
| 297808 ||  || — || January 9, 2002 || Socorro || LINEAR || — || align=right | 3.7 km || 
|-id=809 bgcolor=#fefefe
| 297809 ||  || — || January 9, 2002 || Socorro || LINEAR || NYS || align=right data-sort-value="0.77" | 770 m || 
|-id=810 bgcolor=#d6d6d6
| 297810 ||  || — || January 8, 2002 || Socorro || LINEAR || — || align=right | 4.3 km || 
|-id=811 bgcolor=#fefefe
| 297811 ||  || — || January 8, 2002 || Socorro || LINEAR || NYS || align=right data-sort-value="0.86" | 860 m || 
|-id=812 bgcolor=#d6d6d6
| 297812 ||  || — || January 8, 2002 || Socorro || LINEAR || THM || align=right | 2.8 km || 
|-id=813 bgcolor=#d6d6d6
| 297813 ||  || — || January 9, 2002 || Socorro || LINEAR || — || align=right | 4.1 km || 
|-id=814 bgcolor=#fefefe
| 297814 ||  || — || January 8, 2002 || Socorro || LINEAR || V || align=right data-sort-value="0.83" | 830 m || 
|-id=815 bgcolor=#fefefe
| 297815 ||  || — || January 8, 2002 || Socorro || LINEAR || NYS || align=right data-sort-value="0.86" | 860 m || 
|-id=816 bgcolor=#d6d6d6
| 297816 ||  || — || January 8, 2002 || Socorro || LINEAR || — || align=right | 3.7 km || 
|-id=817 bgcolor=#fefefe
| 297817 ||  || — || January 8, 2002 || Socorro || LINEAR || — || align=right data-sort-value="0.98" | 980 m || 
|-id=818 bgcolor=#fefefe
| 297818 ||  || — || January 9, 2002 || Socorro || LINEAR || FLO || align=right data-sort-value="0.91" | 910 m || 
|-id=819 bgcolor=#d6d6d6
| 297819 ||  || — || January 9, 2002 || Socorro || LINEAR || — || align=right | 5.7 km || 
|-id=820 bgcolor=#fefefe
| 297820 ||  || — || January 9, 2002 || Socorro || LINEAR || — || align=right | 1.1 km || 
|-id=821 bgcolor=#d6d6d6
| 297821 ||  || — || January 8, 2002 || Socorro || LINEAR || — || align=right | 5.2 km || 
|-id=822 bgcolor=#fefefe
| 297822 ||  || — || January 9, 2002 || Socorro || LINEAR || — || align=right | 1.3 km || 
|-id=823 bgcolor=#d6d6d6
| 297823 ||  || — || January 13, 2002 || Socorro || LINEAR || EOS || align=right | 6.3 km || 
|-id=824 bgcolor=#fefefe
| 297824 ||  || — || January 14, 2002 || Socorro || LINEAR || V || align=right | 1.1 km || 
|-id=825 bgcolor=#d6d6d6
| 297825 ||  || — || January 14, 2002 || Socorro || LINEAR || EUP || align=right | 4.9 km || 
|-id=826 bgcolor=#d6d6d6
| 297826 ||  || — || January 14, 2002 || Socorro || LINEAR || — || align=right | 4.5 km || 
|-id=827 bgcolor=#d6d6d6
| 297827 ||  || — || January 13, 2002 || Socorro || LINEAR || — || align=right | 5.5 km || 
|-id=828 bgcolor=#fefefe
| 297828 ||  || — || January 13, 2002 || Socorro || LINEAR || — || align=right | 1.0 km || 
|-id=829 bgcolor=#d6d6d6
| 297829 ||  || — || January 13, 2002 || Socorro || LINEAR || — || align=right | 4.7 km || 
|-id=830 bgcolor=#fefefe
| 297830 ||  || — || January 12, 2002 || Nyukasa || Mount Nyukasa Stn. || ERI || align=right | 1.9 km || 
|-id=831 bgcolor=#fefefe
| 297831 ||  || — || January 5, 2002 || Kitt Peak || Spacewatch || — || align=right | 1.1 km || 
|-id=832 bgcolor=#d6d6d6
| 297832 ||  || — || January 8, 2002 || Socorro || LINEAR || — || align=right | 3.7 km || 
|-id=833 bgcolor=#d6d6d6
| 297833 ||  || — || January 11, 2002 || Kitt Peak || Spacewatch || THM || align=right | 2.3 km || 
|-id=834 bgcolor=#fefefe
| 297834 ||  || — || January 12, 2002 || Kitt Peak || Spacewatch || — || align=right data-sort-value="0.91" | 910 m || 
|-id=835 bgcolor=#fefefe
| 297835 ||  || — || January 13, 2002 || Socorro || LINEAR || — || align=right data-sort-value="0.81" | 810 m || 
|-id=836 bgcolor=#fefefe
| 297836 ||  || — || January 8, 2002 || Kitt Peak || Spacewatch || — || align=right | 1.1 km || 
|-id=837 bgcolor=#FA8072
| 297837 ||  || — || January 19, 2002 || Socorro || LINEAR || — || align=right | 1.3 km || 
|-id=838 bgcolor=#d6d6d6
| 297838 ||  || — || January 19, 2002 || Socorro || LINEAR || — || align=right | 3.7 km || 
|-id=839 bgcolor=#FA8072
| 297839 ||  || — || January 19, 2002 || Socorro || LINEAR || — || align=right | 2.7 km || 
|-id=840 bgcolor=#fefefe
| 297840 ||  || — || January 21, 2002 || Socorro || LINEAR || — || align=right | 1.2 km || 
|-id=841 bgcolor=#d6d6d6
| 297841 ||  || — || January 22, 2002 || Socorro || LINEAR || — || align=right | 4.1 km || 
|-id=842 bgcolor=#d6d6d6
| 297842 ||  || — || January 20, 2002 || Anderson Mesa || LONEOS || EOS || align=right | 3.2 km || 
|-id=843 bgcolor=#d6d6d6
| 297843 ||  || — || January 21, 2002 || Anderson Mesa || LONEOS || AEG || align=right | 5.8 km || 
|-id=844 bgcolor=#fefefe
| 297844 ||  || — || February 3, 2002 || Palomar || NEAT || ERI || align=right | 1.9 km || 
|-id=845 bgcolor=#fefefe
| 297845 ||  || — || February 4, 2002 || Palomar || NEAT || — || align=right data-sort-value="0.89" | 890 m || 
|-id=846 bgcolor=#d6d6d6
| 297846 ||  || — || February 1, 2002 || Socorro || LINEAR || — || align=right | 3.6 km || 
|-id=847 bgcolor=#FA8072
| 297847 ||  || — || February 1, 2002 || Socorro || LINEAR || PHO || align=right | 1.2 km || 
|-id=848 bgcolor=#fefefe
| 297848 ||  || — || February 6, 2002 || Desert Eagle || W. K. Y. Yeung || MAS || align=right | 1.2 km || 
|-id=849 bgcolor=#d6d6d6
| 297849 ||  || — || February 5, 2002 || Palomar || NEAT || — || align=right | 3.4 km || 
|-id=850 bgcolor=#fefefe
| 297850 ||  || — || February 5, 2002 || Palomar || NEAT || — || align=right | 1.0 km || 
|-id=851 bgcolor=#fefefe
| 297851 ||  || — || February 6, 2002 || Socorro || LINEAR || H || align=right data-sort-value="0.65" | 650 m || 
|-id=852 bgcolor=#fefefe
| 297852 ||  || — || February 4, 2002 || Palomar || NEAT || V || align=right data-sort-value="0.85" | 850 m || 
|-id=853 bgcolor=#fefefe
| 297853 ||  || — || February 5, 2002 || Palomar || NEAT || — || align=right | 1.2 km || 
|-id=854 bgcolor=#fefefe
| 297854 ||  || — || February 7, 2002 || Kitt Peak || Spacewatch || V || align=right data-sort-value="0.78" | 780 m || 
|-id=855 bgcolor=#fefefe
| 297855 ||  || — || February 9, 2002 || Socorro || LINEAR || H || align=right data-sort-value="0.71" | 710 m || 
|-id=856 bgcolor=#fefefe
| 297856 ||  || — || February 6, 2002 || Socorro || LINEAR || — || align=right | 1.2 km || 
|-id=857 bgcolor=#E9E9E9
| 297857 ||  || — || February 6, 2002 || Socorro || LINEAR || — || align=right | 2.0 km || 
|-id=858 bgcolor=#d6d6d6
| 297858 ||  || — || February 7, 2002 || Socorro || LINEAR || — || align=right | 3.7 km || 
|-id=859 bgcolor=#fefefe
| 297859 ||  || — || February 7, 2002 || Socorro || LINEAR || — || align=right | 1.0 km || 
|-id=860 bgcolor=#fefefe
| 297860 ||  || — || February 7, 2002 || Socorro || LINEAR || — || align=right | 1.5 km || 
|-id=861 bgcolor=#fefefe
| 297861 ||  || — || February 12, 2002 || Socorro || LINEAR || PHO || align=right | 1.7 km || 
|-id=862 bgcolor=#fefefe
| 297862 ||  || — || February 7, 2002 || Socorro || LINEAR || NYS || align=right data-sort-value="0.57" | 570 m || 
|-id=863 bgcolor=#fefefe
| 297863 ||  || — || February 7, 2002 || Socorro || LINEAR || — || align=right data-sort-value="0.90" | 900 m || 
|-id=864 bgcolor=#d6d6d6
| 297864 ||  || — || February 7, 2002 || Socorro || LINEAR || EUP || align=right | 4.4 km || 
|-id=865 bgcolor=#fefefe
| 297865 ||  || — || February 7, 2002 || Socorro || LINEAR || MAS || align=right | 1.3 km || 
|-id=866 bgcolor=#fefefe
| 297866 ||  || — || February 7, 2002 || Socorro || LINEAR || — || align=right data-sort-value="0.87" | 870 m || 
|-id=867 bgcolor=#fefefe
| 297867 ||  || — || February 7, 2002 || Socorro || LINEAR || NYS || align=right data-sort-value="0.79" | 790 m || 
|-id=868 bgcolor=#fefefe
| 297868 ||  || — || February 7, 2002 || Socorro || LINEAR || ERI || align=right | 2.4 km || 
|-id=869 bgcolor=#fefefe
| 297869 ||  || — || February 7, 2002 || Socorro || LINEAR || — || align=right | 1.00 km || 
|-id=870 bgcolor=#fefefe
| 297870 ||  || — || February 7, 2002 || Socorro || LINEAR || — || align=right | 1.1 km || 
|-id=871 bgcolor=#d6d6d6
| 297871 ||  || — || February 7, 2002 || Socorro || LINEAR || — || align=right | 4.2 km || 
|-id=872 bgcolor=#fefefe
| 297872 ||  || — || February 12, 2002 || Desert Eagle || W. K. Y. Yeung || — || align=right | 1.2 km || 
|-id=873 bgcolor=#fefefe
| 297873 ||  || — || February 7, 2002 || Socorro || LINEAR || V || align=right | 1.0 km || 
|-id=874 bgcolor=#fefefe
| 297874 ||  || — || February 7, 2002 || Socorro || LINEAR || — || align=right data-sort-value="0.88" | 880 m || 
|-id=875 bgcolor=#fefefe
| 297875 ||  || — || February 7, 2002 || Socorro || LINEAR || ERI || align=right | 2.0 km || 
|-id=876 bgcolor=#fefefe
| 297876 ||  || — || February 7, 2002 || Socorro || LINEAR || — || align=right | 1.2 km || 
|-id=877 bgcolor=#fefefe
| 297877 ||  || — || February 7, 2002 || Socorro || LINEAR || NYS || align=right data-sort-value="0.64" | 640 m || 
|-id=878 bgcolor=#fefefe
| 297878 ||  || — || February 7, 2002 || Socorro || LINEAR || NYS || align=right data-sort-value="0.96" | 960 m || 
|-id=879 bgcolor=#fefefe
| 297879 ||  || — || February 8, 2002 || Socorro || LINEAR || — || align=right data-sort-value="0.83" | 830 m || 
|-id=880 bgcolor=#fefefe
| 297880 ||  || — || February 8, 2002 || Socorro || LINEAR || — || align=right | 1.2 km || 
|-id=881 bgcolor=#fefefe
| 297881 ||  || — || February 10, 2002 || Socorro || LINEAR || — || align=right data-sort-value="0.85" | 850 m || 
|-id=882 bgcolor=#fefefe
| 297882 ||  || — || February 10, 2002 || Socorro || LINEAR || MAS || align=right data-sort-value="0.93" | 930 m || 
|-id=883 bgcolor=#fefefe
| 297883 ||  || — || February 8, 2002 || Socorro || LINEAR || H || align=right data-sort-value="0.51" | 510 m || 
|-id=884 bgcolor=#fefefe
| 297884 ||  || — || February 7, 2002 || Socorro || LINEAR || — || align=right | 1.4 km || 
|-id=885 bgcolor=#fefefe
| 297885 ||  || — || February 7, 2002 || Socorro || LINEAR || FLO || align=right data-sort-value="0.87" | 870 m || 
|-id=886 bgcolor=#d6d6d6
| 297886 ||  || — || February 8, 2002 || Socorro || LINEAR || EUP || align=right | 5.9 km || 
|-id=887 bgcolor=#fefefe
| 297887 ||  || — || February 8, 2002 || Socorro || LINEAR || V || align=right | 1.0 km || 
|-id=888 bgcolor=#fefefe
| 297888 ||  || — || February 8, 2002 || Socorro || LINEAR || NYS || align=right data-sort-value="0.87" | 870 m || 
|-id=889 bgcolor=#d6d6d6
| 297889 ||  || — || February 10, 2002 || Socorro || LINEAR || HYG || align=right | 2.8 km || 
|-id=890 bgcolor=#d6d6d6
| 297890 ||  || — || February 10, 2002 || Socorro || LINEAR || HYG || align=right | 3.8 km || 
|-id=891 bgcolor=#fefefe
| 297891 ||  || — || February 10, 2002 || Socorro || LINEAR || MAS || align=right | 1.0 km || 
|-id=892 bgcolor=#fefefe
| 297892 ||  || — || February 10, 2002 || Socorro || LINEAR || V || align=right data-sort-value="0.65" | 650 m || 
|-id=893 bgcolor=#d6d6d6
| 297893 ||  || — || February 10, 2002 || Socorro || LINEAR || — || align=right | 3.4 km || 
|-id=894 bgcolor=#fefefe
| 297894 ||  || — || February 10, 2002 || Socorro || LINEAR || — || align=right | 1.1 km || 
|-id=895 bgcolor=#fefefe
| 297895 ||  || — || February 10, 2002 || Socorro || LINEAR || FLO || align=right data-sort-value="0.86" | 860 m || 
|-id=896 bgcolor=#fefefe
| 297896 ||  || — || February 10, 2002 || Socorro || LINEAR || MAS || align=right data-sort-value="0.93" | 930 m || 
|-id=897 bgcolor=#fefefe
| 297897 ||  || — || February 10, 2002 || Socorro || LINEAR || NYS || align=right data-sort-value="0.85" | 850 m || 
|-id=898 bgcolor=#fefefe
| 297898 ||  || — || February 8, 2002 || Socorro || LINEAR || — || align=right | 1.2 km || 
|-id=899 bgcolor=#fefefe
| 297899 ||  || — || February 11, 2002 || Socorro || LINEAR || — || align=right | 1.2 km || 
|-id=900 bgcolor=#d6d6d6
| 297900 ||  || — || February 11, 2002 || Socorro || LINEAR || — || align=right | 3.9 km || 
|}

297901–298000 

|-bgcolor=#fefefe
| 297901 ||  || — || February 6, 2002 || Palomar || NEAT || — || align=right | 1.2 km || 
|-id=902 bgcolor=#d6d6d6
| 297902 ||  || — || February 7, 2002 || Palomar || NEAT || — || align=right | 3.4 km || 
|-id=903 bgcolor=#d6d6d6
| 297903 ||  || — || February 8, 2002 || Kitt Peak || Spacewatch || THM || align=right | 2.5 km || 
|-id=904 bgcolor=#d6d6d6
| 297904 ||  || — || February 9, 2002 || Palomar || NEAT || — || align=right | 6.1 km || 
|-id=905 bgcolor=#fefefe
| 297905 ||  || — || February 8, 2002 || Kitt Peak || M. W. Buie || — || align=right data-sort-value="0.86" | 860 m || 
|-id=906 bgcolor=#fefefe
| 297906 ||  || — || February 10, 2002 || Kitt Peak || Spacewatch || V || align=right | 1.0 km || 
|-id=907 bgcolor=#d6d6d6
| 297907 ||  || — || February 10, 2002 || Socorro || LINEAR || LUT || align=right | 6.5 km || 
|-id=908 bgcolor=#fefefe
| 297908 ||  || — || February 10, 2002 || Socorro || LINEAR || MAS || align=right data-sort-value="0.93" | 930 m || 
|-id=909 bgcolor=#fefefe
| 297909 ||  || — || February 11, 2002 || Socorro || LINEAR || NYS || align=right data-sort-value="0.73" | 730 m || 
|-id=910 bgcolor=#d6d6d6
| 297910 ||  || — || February 6, 2002 || Palomar || NEAT || — || align=right | 6.4 km || 
|-id=911 bgcolor=#fefefe
| 297911 ||  || — || February 7, 2002 || Palomar || NEAT || — || align=right data-sort-value="0.88" | 880 m || 
|-id=912 bgcolor=#d6d6d6
| 297912 ||  || — || February 6, 2002 || Palomar || NEAT || HYG || align=right | 3.0 km || 
|-id=913 bgcolor=#fefefe
| 297913 ||  || — || February 19, 2002 || Socorro || LINEAR || H || align=right | 1.2 km || 
|-id=914 bgcolor=#fefefe
| 297914 ||  || — || February 20, 2002 || Socorro || LINEAR || H || align=right data-sort-value="0.71" | 710 m || 
|-id=915 bgcolor=#fefefe
| 297915 ||  || — || February 21, 2002 || Socorro || LINEAR || PHO || align=right | 1.7 km || 
|-id=916 bgcolor=#d6d6d6
| 297916 ||  || — || February 19, 2002 || Socorro || LINEAR || — || align=right | 3.4 km || 
|-id=917 bgcolor=#fefefe
| 297917 ||  || — || February 19, 2002 || Socorro || LINEAR || H || align=right data-sort-value="0.71" | 710 m || 
|-id=918 bgcolor=#d6d6d6
| 297918 ||  || — || February 16, 2002 || Palomar || NEAT || EUP || align=right | 3.6 km || 
|-id=919 bgcolor=#FA8072
| 297919 ||  || — || February 22, 2002 || Palomar || NEAT || H || align=right data-sort-value="0.90" | 900 m || 
|-id=920 bgcolor=#fefefe
| 297920 ||  || — || February 25, 2002 || Palomar || NEAT || — || align=right data-sort-value="0.98" | 980 m || 
|-id=921 bgcolor=#fefefe
| 297921 ||  || — || March 5, 2002 || Desert Eagle || W. K. Y. Yeung || ERI || align=right | 2.4 km || 
|-id=922 bgcolor=#fefefe
| 297922 ||  || — || March 14, 2002 || Desert Eagle || W. K. Y. Yeung || CIM || align=right | 3.0 km || 
|-id=923 bgcolor=#fefefe
| 297923 ||  || — || March 5, 2002 || Haleakala || NEAT || — || align=right | 1.1 km || 
|-id=924 bgcolor=#fefefe
| 297924 ||  || — || March 5, 2002 || Haleakala || NEAT || V || align=right data-sort-value="0.99" | 990 m || 
|-id=925 bgcolor=#fefefe
| 297925 ||  || — || March 12, 2002 || Socorro || LINEAR || — || align=right | 1.3 km || 
|-id=926 bgcolor=#fefefe
| 297926 ||  || — || March 10, 2002 || Haleakala || NEAT || — || align=right | 1.3 km || 
|-id=927 bgcolor=#fefefe
| 297927 ||  || — || March 13, 2002 || Socorro || LINEAR || — || align=right | 1.2 km || 
|-id=928 bgcolor=#d6d6d6
| 297928 ||  || — || March 14, 2002 || Palomar || NEAT || THB || align=right | 3.5 km || 
|-id=929 bgcolor=#fefefe
| 297929 ||  || — || March 12, 2002 || Palomar || NEAT || EUT || align=right data-sort-value="0.85" | 850 m || 
|-id=930 bgcolor=#fefefe
| 297930 ||  || — || March 14, 2002 || Socorro || LINEAR || NYS || align=right data-sort-value="0.88" | 880 m || 
|-id=931 bgcolor=#fefefe
| 297931 ||  || — || March 14, 2002 || Socorro || LINEAR || — || align=right | 1.3 km || 
|-id=932 bgcolor=#fefefe
| 297932 ||  || — || March 9, 2002 || Anderson Mesa || LONEOS || H || align=right data-sort-value="0.68" | 680 m || 
|-id=933 bgcolor=#fefefe
| 297933 ||  || — || March 12, 2002 || Anderson Mesa || LONEOS || V || align=right | 1.0 km || 
|-id=934 bgcolor=#fefefe
| 297934 ||  || — || March 12, 2002 || Palomar || NEAT || — || align=right data-sort-value="0.98" | 980 m || 
|-id=935 bgcolor=#d6d6d6
| 297935 ||  || — || March 12, 2002 || Anderson Mesa || LONEOS || EUP || align=right | 4.1 km || 
|-id=936 bgcolor=#fefefe
| 297936 ||  || — || March 13, 2002 || Kitt Peak || Spacewatch || MAS || align=right data-sort-value="0.92" | 920 m || 
|-id=937 bgcolor=#fefefe
| 297937 ||  || — || March 13, 2002 || Socorro || LINEAR || V || align=right data-sort-value="0.87" | 870 m || 
|-id=938 bgcolor=#fefefe
| 297938 ||  || — || March 15, 2002 || Palomar || NEAT || H || align=right data-sort-value="0.64" | 640 m || 
|-id=939 bgcolor=#fefefe
| 297939 ||  || — || March 15, 2002 || Palomar || NEAT || — || align=right | 1.2 km || 
|-id=940 bgcolor=#d6d6d6
| 297940 ||  || — || March 15, 2002 || Mount Hamilton || Lick Obs. || — || align=right | 2.8 km || 
|-id=941 bgcolor=#d6d6d6
| 297941 ||  || — || March 6, 2002 || Palomar || NEAT || — || align=right | 4.0 km || 
|-id=942 bgcolor=#fefefe
| 297942 ||  || — || March 6, 2002 || Palomar || NEAT || ERI || align=right | 1.8 km || 
|-id=943 bgcolor=#fefefe
| 297943 ||  || — || March 23, 2002 || Nogales || Tenagra II Obs. || — || align=right | 1.3 km || 
|-id=944 bgcolor=#d6d6d6
| 297944 ||  || — || March 20, 2002 || Palomar || NEAT || EUP || align=right | 4.2 km || 
|-id=945 bgcolor=#d6d6d6
| 297945 ||  || — || March 22, 2002 || Palomar || NEAT || — || align=right | 4.1 km || 
|-id=946 bgcolor=#fefefe
| 297946 ||  || — || March 16, 2002 || Socorro || LINEAR || MAS || align=right | 1.0 km || 
|-id=947 bgcolor=#fefefe
| 297947 ||  || — || March 18, 2002 || Haleakala || NEAT || — || align=right | 1.5 km || 
|-id=948 bgcolor=#fefefe
| 297948 ||  || — || March 17, 2002 || Kitt Peak || Spacewatch || MAS || align=right data-sort-value="0.77" | 770 m || 
|-id=949 bgcolor=#d6d6d6
| 297949 ||  || — || March 20, 2002 || Palomar || NEAT || TIR || align=right | 3.3 km || 
|-id=950 bgcolor=#E9E9E9
| 297950 ||  || — || March 18, 2002 || Kitt Peak || Spacewatch || — || align=right | 1.1 km || 
|-id=951 bgcolor=#fefefe
| 297951 ||  || — || April 2, 2002 || Palomar || NEAT || — || align=right | 1.4 km || 
|-id=952 bgcolor=#fefefe
| 297952 ||  || — || April 5, 2002 || Anderson Mesa || LONEOS || NYS || align=right | 1.0 km || 
|-id=953 bgcolor=#fefefe
| 297953 ||  || — || April 8, 2002 || Palomar || NEAT || NYS || align=right data-sort-value="0.98" | 980 m || 
|-id=954 bgcolor=#E9E9E9
| 297954 ||  || — || April 10, 2002 || Palomar || NEAT || — || align=right | 3.6 km || 
|-id=955 bgcolor=#fefefe
| 297955 ||  || — || April 10, 2002 || Socorro || LINEAR || — || align=right | 1.1 km || 
|-id=956 bgcolor=#E9E9E9
| 297956 ||  || — || April 11, 2002 || Socorro || LINEAR || — || align=right | 1.9 km || 
|-id=957 bgcolor=#E9E9E9
| 297957 ||  || — || April 10, 2002 || Socorro || LINEAR || — || align=right | 1.1 km || 
|-id=958 bgcolor=#E9E9E9
| 297958 ||  || — || April 12, 2002 || Palomar || NEAT || — || align=right | 1.3 km || 
|-id=959 bgcolor=#d6d6d6
| 297959 ||  || — || April 13, 2002 || Palomar || NEAT || — || align=right | 4.0 km || 
|-id=960 bgcolor=#fefefe
| 297960 ||  || — || April 15, 2002 || Anderson Mesa || LONEOS || — || align=right | 1.5 km || 
|-id=961 bgcolor=#fefefe
| 297961 ||  || — || April 9, 2002 || Socorro || LINEAR || — || align=right | 1.5 km || 
|-id=962 bgcolor=#fefefe
| 297962 ||  || — || April 2, 2002 || Palomar || NEAT || — || align=right | 1.2 km || 
|-id=963 bgcolor=#fefefe
| 297963 ||  || — || April 9, 2002 || Palomar || NEAT || NYS || align=right data-sort-value="0.80" | 800 m || 
|-id=964 bgcolor=#E9E9E9
| 297964 ||  || — || April 19, 2002 || Kitt Peak || Spacewatch || — || align=right | 1.5 km || 
|-id=965 bgcolor=#E9E9E9
| 297965 ||  || — || April 21, 2002 || Palomar || NEAT || — || align=right | 1.5 km || 
|-id=966 bgcolor=#d6d6d6
| 297966 ||  || — || April 17, 2002 || Socorro || LINEAR || 7:4 || align=right | 5.0 km || 
|-id=967 bgcolor=#E9E9E9
| 297967 ||  || — || April 18, 2002 || Palomar || NEAT || — || align=right | 1.4 km || 
|-id=968 bgcolor=#E9E9E9
| 297968 ||  || — || May 7, 2002 || Palomar || NEAT || — || align=right | 2.7 km || 
|-id=969 bgcolor=#E9E9E9
| 297969 ||  || — || May 8, 2002 || Socorro || LINEAR || — || align=right | 1.0 km || 
|-id=970 bgcolor=#E9E9E9
| 297970 ||  || — || May 9, 2002 || Socorro || LINEAR || — || align=right | 1.6 km || 
|-id=971 bgcolor=#fefefe
| 297971 ||  || — || May 9, 2002 || Socorro || LINEAR || — || align=right | 1.3 km || 
|-id=972 bgcolor=#E9E9E9
| 297972 ||  || — || May 9, 2002 || Socorro || LINEAR || — || align=right | 2.6 km || 
|-id=973 bgcolor=#E9E9E9
| 297973 ||  || — || May 9, 2002 || Socorro || LINEAR || — || align=right | 1.6 km || 
|-id=974 bgcolor=#E9E9E9
| 297974 ||  || — || May 11, 2002 || Socorro || LINEAR || — || align=right | 2.0 km || 
|-id=975 bgcolor=#E9E9E9
| 297975 ||  || — || May 11, 2002 || Socorro || LINEAR || JUN || align=right | 1.2 km || 
|-id=976 bgcolor=#E9E9E9
| 297976 ||  || — || May 6, 2002 || Socorro || LINEAR || — || align=right | 1.4 km || 
|-id=977 bgcolor=#E9E9E9
| 297977 ||  || — || May 15, 2002 || Socorro || LINEAR || — || align=right | 2.5 km || 
|-id=978 bgcolor=#E9E9E9
| 297978 ||  || — || May 1, 2002 || Palomar || NEAT || — || align=right | 1.3 km || 
|-id=979 bgcolor=#E9E9E9
| 297979 ||  || — || May 16, 2002 || Socorro || LINEAR || EUN || align=right | 1.5 km || 
|-id=980 bgcolor=#fefefe
| 297980 ||  || — || May 18, 2002 || Palomar || NEAT || — || align=right | 1.1 km || 
|-id=981 bgcolor=#fefefe
| 297981 ||  || — || June 1, 2002 || Palomar || NEAT || — || align=right data-sort-value="0.91" | 910 m || 
|-id=982 bgcolor=#E9E9E9
| 297982 ||  || — || June 6, 2002 || Socorro || LINEAR || EUN || align=right | 1.6 km || 
|-id=983 bgcolor=#E9E9E9
| 297983 ||  || — || June 6, 2002 || Socorro || LINEAR || — || align=right | 1.7 km || 
|-id=984 bgcolor=#E9E9E9
| 297984 ||  || — || June 10, 2002 || Socorro || LINEAR || — || align=right | 1.8 km || 
|-id=985 bgcolor=#E9E9E9
| 297985 ||  || — || June 10, 2002 || Socorro || LINEAR || RAF || align=right | 1.2 km || 
|-id=986 bgcolor=#E9E9E9
| 297986 ||  || — || June 1, 2002 || Palomar || NEAT || — || align=right | 2.0 km || 
|-id=987 bgcolor=#E9E9E9
| 297987 ||  || — || June 20, 2002 || Palomar || NEAT || — || align=right | 3.6 km || 
|-id=988 bgcolor=#E9E9E9
| 297988 ||  || — || June 22, 2002 || Palomar || NEAT || — || align=right | 2.2 km || 
|-id=989 bgcolor=#E9E9E9
| 297989 ||  || — || June 17, 2002 || Palomar || NEAT || — || align=right | 1.8 km || 
|-id=990 bgcolor=#E9E9E9
| 297990 ||  || — || July 9, 2002 || Palomar || NEAT || — || align=right | 2.5 km || 
|-id=991 bgcolor=#E9E9E9
| 297991 ||  || — || July 9, 2002 || Socorro || LINEAR || — || align=right | 3.0 km || 
|-id=992 bgcolor=#E9E9E9
| 297992 ||  || — || July 9, 2002 || Socorro || LINEAR || ADE || align=right | 2.8 km || 
|-id=993 bgcolor=#E9E9E9
| 297993 ||  || — || July 14, 2002 || Hibiscus || S. F. Hönig || — || align=right | 2.6 km || 
|-id=994 bgcolor=#E9E9E9
| 297994 ||  || — || July 14, 2002 || Palomar || NEAT || MIS || align=right | 2.5 km || 
|-id=995 bgcolor=#E9E9E9
| 297995 ||  || — || July 9, 2002 || Palomar || NEAT || EUN || align=right | 1.2 km || 
|-id=996 bgcolor=#E9E9E9
| 297996 ||  || — || July 8, 2002 || Palomar || NEAT || — || align=right | 2.2 km || 
|-id=997 bgcolor=#E9E9E9
| 297997 ||  || — || July 2, 2002 || Palomar || NEAT || EUN || align=right | 1.2 km || 
|-id=998 bgcolor=#E9E9E9
| 297998 ||  || — || July 9, 2002 || Palomar || NEAT || RAF || align=right | 1.0 km || 
|-id=999 bgcolor=#E9E9E9
| 297999 ||  || — || July 3, 2002 || Palomar || NEAT || — || align=right | 2.3 km || 
|-id=000 bgcolor=#E9E9E9
| 298000 ||  || — || July 4, 2002 || Palomar || NEAT || — || align=right | 1.9 km || 
|}

References

External links 
 Discovery Circumstances: Numbered Minor Planets (295001)–(300000) (IAU Minor Planet Center)

0297